= Professional Lacrosse Hall of Fame =

The Professional Lacrosse Hall of Fame is the hall of fame for professional field lacrosse. The inaugural hall of fame class was announced on February 15, 2022. The Hall of Fame recognizes exceptional professional field lacrosse players that played in either the MLL or the PLL.

As of Spring 2024, there is no building or location for the Hall of Fame.

== Induction requirements ==
In order to be eligible for the hall of fame, a player must meet all of the following criteria:

- Minimum of a five-year playing career in the PLL and/or MLL
- Retired from professional play for at least three years
- Must be nominated by a member of the Hall of Fame Committee and receive a 75% majority vote

== Inducted members ==
Key
MVP	Most Valuable Player
OPOY	Offensive Player of the Year
DPOY	Defensive Player of the Year
GOTY	Goalie of the Year
ROTY	Rookie of the Year
Indicates that the player was also inducted into the Canadian Lacrosse Hall of Fame
Indicate that the player was also inducted into the National Lacrosse Hall of Fame
Indicates that the player was inducted into both the Canadian Lacrosse Hall of Fame and the National Lacrosse Hall of Fame
+	Signifies that the player was also inducted into the NLL Hall of Fame

=== 2026 Hall of Fame class ===
The 2026 Professional Lacrosse Hall of Fame class was announced on June 4, 2026.

The 2026 Professional Lacrosse Hall of Fame class consisted of the following players:

2026 Professional Lacrosse Hall of Fame inductees
Player	Position	Notable achievements	Notable statistics
Brodie Merrill	Long Stick Midfielder	Three-time MLL champion Ten-time All-Star; Six-time DPOY; 2005 MLL ROTY	200 games played (most all-time); 146 points (most all-time by a defender); 1,120 groundballs (tied for most all-time)
Greg Gurenlian	Faceoff Specialist	2015 MLL Champion; 2015 MLL MVP; Seven-time All-Star	2,263 faceoff wins (most all-time); 58.8% faceoff win percentage 40 assists (most all-time by a faceoff specialist); 1,120 ground balls (tied for most all-time)
Drew Adams	Goalie	2015 MLL Champion; Three-time GOTY; Five-time All-Star	1,966 saves (most all-time); 52.8% career save percentage
Joseph Tsai	Contributor		

=== 2025 Hall of Fame class ===
The 2025 Professional Lacrosse Hall of Fame class was announced on May 21, 2025.

The 2025 Professional Lacrosse Hall of Fame class consisted of the following players:

2025 Professional Lacrosse Hall of Fame inductees
Player	Position	Notable achievements	Notable statistics
Kyle Harrison	Midfield	One-time MLL champion Seven-time MLL All-Star; Two-time PLL All-Star	144 games played 242 points 150 total goals 82 assists
Kevin Leveille	Attack	Seven-time MLL All-Star; MLL 10th Anniversary Team	124 games played 371 points 287 total goals 82 assists
Paul Rabil	Midfield	Two-time MLL Champion; Three-time MLL OPOY	657 career points (1st all-time); 355 total goals (2nd all-time); 50 2-point goals (2nd all-time); 252 assists (5th all-time)
Joe Walters	Midfield	Two-time MLL Champion; Ten-time MLL All-Star	166 games played (9th all-time); 565 career points (4th all-time); 267 assists (3rd all-time)

=== 2024 Hall of Fame class ===
The 2024 Professional Lacrosse Hall of Fame class was announced on April 18, 2024.

The 2024 Professional Lacrosse Hall of Fame class consisted of the following players:

2024 Professional Lacrosse Hall of Fame inductees
Player	Position	Notable achievements	Notable statistics
Brendan Mundorf	Attack	2012 MLL MVP; Seven-time MLL All-Star	453 career points (8th all-time)
Josh Sims	Midfield	Two-time MLL Champion; Four-time MLL All-Star	
Kyle Sweeney	Defense	Four-time MLL Champion; Seven-time MLL All-Star	183 games played (2nd all-time); 529 ground balls (9th all-time)
Lee Zink	Defense	Two-time MLL Champion; Eight-time MLL All-Star; Two-time MLL DPOY	148 games played (8th all-time)

=== 2023 Hall of Fame class ===
The 2023 Professional Lacrosse Hall of Fame class was announced on March 23, 2023. They were honored in Baltimore during halftime of the August 5 game between the Archers and Atlas.

The 2023 Professional Lacrosse Hall of Fame class consisted of the following players:

2023 Professional Lacrosse Hall of Fame inductees
Player	Position	Notable achievements	Notable statistics
Ryan Powell	Attack	2006 MLL MVP & OPOY; Five-time MLL All-Star	360 career points (15th all-time); 189 career goals, 170 career assists(10th all-time)
Jesse Hubbard	Attack	Five-time MLL All-Star	319 career points (23rd all-time); 225 career goals (19th all-time), 15 career 2-point goals (22nd all-time), 79 career assists
Ryan Boyle	Attack	2004 MLL ROTY; Four-time MLL champion Six-time MLL All-Star	487 career points (6th all-time); 192 career goals (25th all-time), 292 career assists (most all-time)
Roy Colsey	Midfield	Three-time MLL champion	284 career points 187 career goals, 32 career 2-point goals (5th all-time), 65 career assists
Brian Spallina	Defense	Seven-time MLL champion Two-time MLL All-Star	181 games played (3rd all-time); 221.5 penalty minutes (most all-time); 187 career ground balls
Greg Cattrano	Goalie	2002 MLL MVP; Two-time MLL champion Four-time MLL All-Star; Three-time MLL GOTY	799 career saves (14th all-time); 10.6 Goals Against Average; First-ever goalie to score a professional goal (June 26, 2004, against Rochester)

=== 2022 Hall of Fame class (inaugural class) ===
The 2022 Professional Lacrosse Hall of Fame class was announced on February 15, 2022.

The 2022 Professional Lacrosse Hall of Fame class consisted of the following players:

2022 Professional Lacrosse Hall of Fame inductees
Player	Position	Notable achievements	Notable statistics	Ref.
Mark Millon	Attack	First ever player to reach 300 career points 2005 MLL Co-MVP		
Casey Powell +	Attack	2014 MLL MVP; Three-time MLL champion	523 career points (4th all-time); 262 career goals (9th all-time), 256 career assists (3rd all-time)	
John Grant Jr. +	Attack	Five-time MLL champion	393 career goals (most all-time)	
Jay Jalbert	Midfield	Two-time MLL champion Four-time MLL All-Star	198 career points	
Gary Gait +	Midfield	2005 MLL Co-MVP; Three-time MLL champion MLL All-Decade team (2000's)	226 career points 162 career goals	
Matt Striebel	Midfield	Three-time MLL champion 2007 MLL Championship game MVP	382 career points (9th all-time); 127 career assists (16th all-time)	
John Gagliardi	Defense	Two-time MLL champion Five-time MLL All-Star; 2004 All-MLL defenseman		
Pat McCabe	Defense	Three-time MLL champion		
Nicky Polanco	Defense	Three-time MLL champion Two-time MLL DPOY	480 career groundballs (10th all-time)	
Paul Cantabene	Faceoff Specialist	Three-time MLL champion	85 career points 60 career goals, one two-point goal, 24 assists	
Brian Dougherty	Goalie	Three-time MLL champion Six-time MLL All-Star; MLL All-Decade team (2000's)	1,003 career saves	

== Hall of Fame Committee members ==
The Hall of Fame Committee nominates candidates, creates the ballot for Hall of Fame selection, and votes on who should be inducted into the Hall of Fame. The current Hall of Fame Committee has ten members.

The current Hall of Fame Committee consists of the following members:

- Brian Silcott
- Seth Tierney
- Bill Daye
- Tony Resch
- Gerry Byrne
- Scott Burnham
- Scott Hiller
- Gewas Schindler
- Vinny Sombratto
- Gordon Purdie
