= Josh Sims (lacrosse) =

American lacrosse player (born 1978)

Personal information
- Nationality: American
- Born: July 29, 1978 (age 48) Annapolis, Maryland, U.S.
- Height: 6 ft 2 in (188 cm)
- Weight: 205 lb (93 kg; 14 st 9 lb)

Sport
- Position: Transition/Midfield
- Shoots: Right
- NCAA team: Princeton
- NLL draft: 11th overall, 2000; Rochester Knighthawks
- NLL teams: Washington Power (2001–2002); Colorado Mammoth (2003–2009); Philadelphia Wings (2010)
- MLL team Former teams: Denver Outlaws; Baltimore Bayhawks (2001–2005); Denver Outlaws (2006–2009); Washington Bayhawks (2009–2010)*; Toronto Nationals (2010); Chicago Machine (2010); Denver Outlaws (2012)
- Pro career: 2002–

Career highlights
- College highlights: Top VIII Award (2001); McLaughlin Award (1998 & 2000); Men's Ivy League Player of the Year (2000); All-American 3x (1st team: 1998, 1999, 2000); Academic All-American (1st team: 2000; 2nd team: 1999); USILA Scholar All-American (2000); NCAA Men's Lacrosse Championship (1997 & 1998); Professional highlights: Major League Lacrosse Steinfeld Cup Champion (2002 & 2005); Major League Lacrosse All-Star 5x (2001, 2002, 2005, 2006, 2007); Major League Lacrosse 10th Anniversary Team (2010); Major League Lacrosse All-time playoff goals scored record.; National Lacrosse League Champion's Cup (2006); National Lacrosse League All-Star (2007)

Joshua S. Sims (born July 29, 1978) is an American former professional lacrosse player. He played in Major League Lacrosse through 2013 and last played box lacrosse in the National Lacrosse League with the Philadelphia Wings in 2010. He starred as a member of the Princeton Tigers men's lacrosse team from 1997 through 2000. He is a two-time NCAA champion, three-time MLL champion, and one-time NLL champion.

At Princeton, he earned Ivy League Player of the Year honors, three first team United States Intercollegiate Lacrosse Association (USILA) All-American recognitions and three first team All-Ivy League selections, two NCAA midfielder of the year honors, NCAA Top VIII Award recognition and two-time Academic All-American (first team once) honors. During his college career, Princeton earned four Ivy League championships, four NCAA Men's Lacrosse Championship tournament invitations and two NCAA championships.

As a professional, he is a five-time MLL All-star and an NLL All-star. In the MLL, he has earned two league championships and holds the all-time league record for playoff goals scored. He also has an NLL championship. He was selected to the MLL 10th Anniversary team in August 2010 and the Colorado Mammoth 10th Anniversary team in 2011.

Sims is currently Head of Lacrosse for the Premier Lacrosse League.

== Background ==
As an ambidextrous junior lacrosse midfielder, he scored 20 goals and had 16 assists for the Severn School, earning him All-Anne Arundel County honors from the Baltimore Sun. Sims was an All-Anne Arundel County selection by the Baltimore Sun again as a senior captain when he was also named an All-Metro selection for controlling 72% of his face-offs, while scoring 28 goals and adding 12 assists. Sims was a member of the Under-19 Team USA that won the World Championship in Tokyo in 1996.

== Collegiate career ==
After graduating from Severn, Sims attended Princeton University. He was the first Princeton Student-Athlete to be presented with the NCAA Top VIII Award (the first lacrosse player to be presented with the award since 1983). He was only the fourth Ivy League athlete honored in the award's 27-year history. He was awarded the 1998 & 2000 McLaughlin Award as the best NCAA lacrosse midfielder. He was a first team USILA All-American Team selection in 1998, 1999 and 2000. He was also first team All-Ivy League in 1998, 1999 and 2000. Sims earned the 2000 Men's Ivy League Player of the Year. As a freshman, he was a member of the 1997 team that is regarded as the best in school history with a record number of wins during its 15–0 season. He served as co-captain of the 2000 team. Sims is one of two Princeton Lacrosse two-time Academic All-Americans. Following the 1999 season, he was selected as an at-large second team Academic All-American, and following the 2000 season, he was a first team selection. He was also a 2000 USILA Scholar All-American.

The 1997–2000 teams were 6–0 undefeated outright Ivy League Conference champions. Two of these undefeated league champions won the 1997 and 1998 NCAA Division I Men's Lacrosse Championships, becoming the first team to threepeat since Syracuse from 1988–90 and the first to be recognized to have done so without an NCAA scandal since Johns Hopkins from 1978–80. The 1999 and 2000 teams also earned NCAA Men's Lacrosse Championship invitations, bringing the schools streak to eleven consecutive seasons.

In Sims' first game as a Tiger, he scored the game-winning goal in a 1997 overtime 7–6 victory over Johns Hopkins. Ten years later, ESPN described the goal as a "leaping, behind-the-back" shot, while the Baltimore Sun described the shot by saying that ". . .Sims flicked in a rebound shot blindly behind his back." He was recognized twice in 1997 as Ivy League Rookie of the Week. During the 1998 season, Sims became a scoring threat from midfield as most defenses focused on the All-American trio of Princeton attackmen (Jesse Hubbard, Chris Massey and Jon Hess). In the 1998 NCAA Division I Men's Lacrosse Championship tournament, Sims scored a game-high four goals in the quarterfinal 11–9 victory over Duke and a team-high three goals, including the game-winning goal in the semifinal 11–10 victory against Syracuse. For his efforts, he was named to the All-tournament team. In 1999, he scored a quadruple overtime game-winning goal helping Princeton secure it invitation to the 1999 NCAA Division I Men's Lacrosse Championship tournament with its seventh consecutive victory. In the 2000 NCAA Division I Men's Lacrosse Championship tournament, he posted two goals and two assists in the 10–7 quarterfinal victory over Maryland. He also scored in the 12–11 semifinal victory against Virginia. Sims' two goals made him the only person to score multiple goals for Princeton in the championship game 13–7 loss to Syracuse.

== Professional career ==
=== NLL career ===
Sims played the 2000 and 2001 seasons for the Washington Power of the National Lacrosse League. He then played the 2003 through 2009 seasons with the Colorado Mammoth. Sims was an original member of the Mammoth when they moved from Washington. He helped lead the Mammoth to their 2006 National Lacrosse League Champion's Cup. In 2007 Season he was recognized by the league as one of the top transition players in the game by being named Transition Player of the Week three times and being named to his first National Lacrosse League All-Star Game as a reserve. Prior to the 2009 NLL season, Sims announced his retirement from the indoor lacrosse league, and officially retired after the 2009 season. However, he returned to play the 2010 season for the Philadelphia Wings.

=== MLL career ===
Sims, who did not play in the 2014 season, has played in the MLL since 2001: Baltimore Bayhawks (2001–2005); Denver Outlaws (2006–2009, 2012), Toronto Nationals (2010) and Chicago Machine (2010). Sims was a starter and scored in the inaugural MLL All-Star Game in 2001. In 2002 and 2005 he was a member of the Baltimore Bayhawks Major League Lacrosse Champion Steinfeld Cup winners. In the 2002 All-Star game he had a goal and an assist. In the 2002 championship game, he scored four second half goals in the 21–13 victory over the Long Island Lizards, which followed a two-goal semifinal performance in a 15–10 victory over the Boston Cannons. During the 2005 season, he made his third MLL All-Star Game appearance. During the playoff semifinals, he 3 goals and 9 ground balls. One of his goals put the Bayhawks ahead for good. Sims was acquired by the Denver Outlaws on March 6, 2006, for the Outlaws 2006 first-round, 2nd overall, Collegiate Draft Pick that eventually became Kyle Dixon. Sims returned to the MLL All-Star game in 2006 and 2007 representing the Outlaws. He scored two goals (one for two points) in the 2006 contest. In December, 2009, Sims was picked up by the Washington Bayhawks during the MLL supplemental draft. On February 12, 2010, Sims was traded from the Bayhawks to the Toronto Nationals. In June, Sims was traded from the Nationals to the Chicago Machine.

As of August 2010, Sims was the Major League Lacrosse All-Time leader in post-season goals scored (29). That month, during the MLL championship weekend, he was named to the 11-man MLL 10th Anniversary team. He did not play in 2011, but in 2012 he returned to the Denver Outlaws and even scored 5 goals in one game for them. He began 2013 on the sideline with a hamstring injury for the Bayhawks.

== Personal life ==
Sims was the founder of Icon Lacrosse, LLC, and former Director of the Boulder Valley Lacrosse Association. According to his Denver Outlaws biography, he is married to Meghan Bauer Sims.

In college, he helped the Tigers to raise approximately $60,000 for the Central Jersey Pediatric AIDS foundation and worked with the Special Olympics. He was an economics major at Princeton and an honors graduate, maintaining a 3.54 GPA.

In the season 9 December 9, 2011 episode of Extreme Makeover: Home Edition on ABC, Sims' helped build a house in Mardela Springs, Maryland over a span of 106 hours in just five days. The nonprofit Project 911 (911nfp.org) along with The Fusion Cos., an Annapolis modular-home builder, built The Johnson-Goslee Family house.

In 2009, Sims was inducted into the Athletic Hall of Fame at his high school, Severn School. In 2020, during the George Floyd protests, Sims renounced this recognition over the school's "failed leadership" in addressing systemic racism.

== Statistics ==
=== NLL ===
The following are his NLL career stats:

		Regular Season						Playoffs
Season	Team	GP	G	A	Pts	LB	PIM	GP	G	A	Pts	LB	PIM
2001	Washington	11	12	13	25	67	6	1	1	1	2	10	0
2002	Washington	14	11	12	23	74	6	2	3	2	5	13	0
2003	Colorado	14	8	20	28	112	8	2	2	0	2	17	0
2004	Colorado	13	5	12	17	85	15	1	2	0	2	10	0
2005	Colorado	16	14	14	28	111	12	1	1	2	3	5	2
2006	Colorado	16	12	7	19	104	26	3	4	3	7	26	2
2007	Colorado	15	19	20	39	136	12	1	1	0	1	7	2
2008	Colorado	10	5	5	10	59	10	0	0	0	0	0	0
2009	Colorado	3	1	5	6	22	0	1	0	0	0	6	0
2010	Philadelphia	11	2	9	11	49	8	0	0	0	0	0	0
NLL totals		123	89	117	206	819	103	12	14	8	22	94	6

=== MLL ===
The following are his MLL career stats:

		Regular Season							Playoffs
Season	Team	GP	G	2ptG	A	Pts	LB	PIM	GP	G	2ptG	A	Pts	LB	PIM
2001	Baltimore	14	16	1	9	26	15	3.5	2	2	0	0	4	8	0.5
2002	Baltimore	14	23	2	9	34	27	1.5	2	6	0	0	8	10	1
2003	Baltimore	7	12	2	5	19	20	4	2	4	0	1	7	7	0
2004	Baltimore	3	5	1	1	7	5	0	1	2	0	1	3	7	0
2005	Baltimore	9	18	0	5	23	26	2	2	4	0	2	6	0	0
2006	Denver	11	19	7	11	37	43	4	2	2	0	2	4	9	0
2007	Denver	12	11	2	9	22	19	0	1	2	0	1	3	1	0
2008	Denver	1	1	0	0	1	0	1	2	1	0	0	1	0	3
2009	Denver	9	11	0	8	19	7	1.5	2	6	0	0	6	2	0
2010	Toronto	2	4	1	1	6	2	0	0	0	0	0	0	0	0
2010	Chicago	7	10	0	5	15	12	2.5	0	0	0	0	0	0	0
2012	Denver	10	13	0	3	16	7	1.5	0	0	0	0	0	0	0
MLL Totals		99	143	16	66	225	183	21.5	16	29	0	7	42	47	1.5

=== Princeton University ===
Season	GP	G	A	Pts	PPG
1997	15	8	2	10	--
1998	15	32	5	37	--
1999	13	27	16	43	--
2000	15	36	15	51	--
Totals	58	103	38	141	--

Preceded by Jim Gonnella; Jay Jalbert	McLaughlin Award; 1998; 2000	Succeeded by Jay Jalbert; Doug Shanahan
Preceded by Joe Pilch	Men's Ivy League Player of the Year; 2000	Succeeded by Ryan Mollett
Preceded by ???	MLL All-Time Post season goals leader 20??–present	Succeeded by current leader
