= Major League Lacrosse All-Star Game =

Major League Lacrosse All-Star Game is the all-star game of the MLL.

== Years ==
=== 2000s ===
==== 2001 ====
The inaugural 2001 All-Star Game, was titled the Major League Lacrosse LacrosseStar Game. From 2001 to 2003, the All-Star Game had the National Division playing the American Division. It did not schedule an All-Star Game in 2004.

==== 2005 ====
The 2005 game took place in Denver, Colorado on Saturday, July 2, 2005. The format for the 2005 game was "Old School" vs. "Young Guns". The rosters were determined by both fan and MLL team voting. Team "Old School" was composed of players who began their MLL careers in the league's inaugural 2001 season. Members of the "Young Guns" team began their playing careers in 2002 through the present.

==== 2006 ====
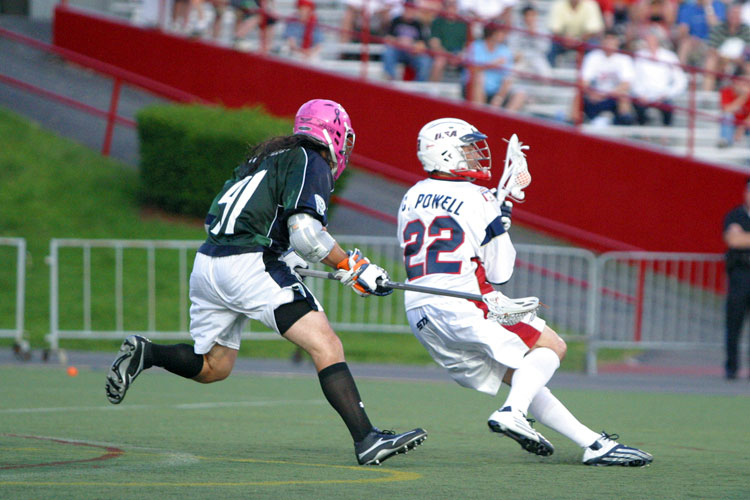
Team USA vs. MLL All-Stars in 2006.

The 2006 Major League Lacrosse All-Star game took place on July 6, 2006, at Boston University’s Nickerson Field. The MLL and US Lacrosse partnered to create the format for this All-Star game, pitting the MLL All-Stars against the United States National Team. The game was a final tune-up for the U.S. Team before they played in the 2006 World Lacrosse Championship.

==== 2007 ====
The 2007 game was played on July 8 in Boston for the second year in row, but this time at Harvard Stadium and was the Western Conference All-Stars against the Eastern Conference All-Stars.

==== 2008 ====
The 2008 game was played in Denver, Colorado, in front of 10,124 people, with the Western Conference defeating the Eastern Conference 31–15, setting a league record for most points scored by an all-star team. Game MVP Ryan Powell scored a record six goals, and also had one assist.

==== 2009 ====
The 2009 game used the "Young Guns vs Old School" format. The "Young Guns" squad was composed of players from the 2007–2009 classes, while the "Old School" squad was made up by those players from the classes prior to and including 2006.

=== 2010s ===
==== 2010 ====
The 2010 game switched it up from their past years teams by having the national lacrosse team, Team USA vs. MLL All-Stars.

==== 2011 ====
The 2011 game, the teams were selected by a pair of honorary captains, who earned the privilege after winning the "Ultimate MLL Fan Fantasy" Contest. "Team Warrior" by Nathan Solomon, a 14-year-old Chesapeake Bayhawks fan from Alpharetta, Georgia and "Team Authority" by Michael Hatala, a 13-year-old Long Island Lizards fan of Glen Cove, New York, selected the teams on the Friday night before the game.

==== 2012 ====
For the 2012 game, MLL returned to the Young Guns vs. Old School teams as in years past.

==== 2013 ====
The 2013 game featured new team names: Team Supernova vs. Team Eclipse.

==== 2016 ====
The 2016 game featured two new team names: Team Riptide vs. Team Rolling Thunder. With only 4,217 fans attending, it was the lowest attendance for a MLL All-Star Game.

==== 2019 ====
The 2019 All-Star Game, the 19th addition, players were voted into the contest by MLL fans and then drafted into teams called Fire and Ice. Team captains were Rob Pannell with B.J. O'Hara as the coach (Fire) and Lyle Thompson with Bill Warder as the coach (Ice). The game took place on Saturday July 27 at Navy-Marine Corps Memorial Stadium in Annapolis, Maryland. Team Ice won by a sudden victory overtime goal by 21-year-old rookie Brendan Sunday 16–15. Even though Team Fire was defeated, Dylan Molloy of Fire earned the MVP honors with a check for $10,000 from sponsor New Balance. Molloy had 5 goals, 1 assist and 6 points.

== Year by year results ==
Season	Date	Winner	Score	Loser	Venue	Location	Most Valuable Player	Attendance
2001	August 2, 2001	National	23–18	American	The Ballpark at Harbor Yard	Bridgeport, Connecticut	Mark Millon	5,462
2002	July 21, 2002	National	21–16	American	Prince George's Stadium	Bowie, Maryland	Scott Urick	5,817
2003	July 17, 2003	National	27–12	American	Mitchel Athletic Complex	Uniondale, New York	Gary Gait	5,674
2004	No Game							
2005	July 2, 2005	Young Guns	21–20 (OT)	Old School	INVESCO Field at Mile High	Denver, Colorado	Michael Powell	12,674
2006	July 6, 2006	Team USA	18–10	MLL All-Stars	Nickerson Field	Boston, Massachusetts	Kevin Cassese	9,234
2007	July 8, 2007	East	19–12	West	Harvard Stadium	Boston, Massachusetts	Matt Poskay	9,581
2008	July 17, 2008	West	31–15	East	INVESCO Field at Mile High	Denver, Colorado	Ryan Powell	10,124
2009	July 16, 2009	Old School	22–21 (OT)	Young Guns	INVESCO Field at Mile High	Denver, Colorado	Brian Langtry	10,123
2010	July 8, 2010	Team USA	13–12	MLL All-Stars	Harvard Stadium	Boston, Massachusetts	Brendan Mundorf	11,771
2011	July 9, 2011	Team Warrior	21–20	Team Authority	Harvard Stadium	Boston, Massachusetts	Michael Kimmel	11,186
2012	June 30, 2012	Old School	18–17 (SO)	Young Guns	FAU Stadium	Boca Raton, Florida	Stephen Berger	7,854
2013	July 13, 2013	Team Supernova	24–15	Team Eclipse	American Legion Memorial Stadium	Charlotte, North Carolina	Kevin Crowley	6,184
2014	June 26, 2014	Team USA	10–9	MLL All-Stars	Harvard Stadium	Boston, Massachusetts	Rob Pannell	10,327
2015	June 13, 2015	MLL Gladiators	27–15	MLL Cowboys	BBVA Compass Stadium	Houston, Texas	Jeremy Boltus	10,084
2016	July 9, 2016	Team Riptide	21–20	Team Rolling Thunder	Titan Stadium	Fullerton, California	Scotty Rodgers	4,217
2017	July 8, 2017	Team Stripes	21–20	Team Stars	Papa Murphy's Park	Sacramento, California	Myles Jones	7,761
2018	June 28, 2018	MLL All-Stars	15–14 (OT)	Team USA	Harvard Stadium	Boston, Massachusetts	Will Manny	6,589
2019	June 27, 2019	Team Ice	16–15 (OT)	Team Fire	Navy-Marine Corps Memorial Stadium	Annapolis, Maryland	Dylan Molloy	6,685
