= 2011 Chesapeake Bayhawks season =

Major League Lacrosse season

2011 Chesapeake Bayhawks
- League: Major League Lacrosse
- Division: 4th MLL
- 2011 record: 6-6
- Home record: 2-4
- Road record: 4-2
- Coach: Brendan Kelly
- Arena: Navy–Marine Corps Memorial Stadium

Team leaders
- Goals: Danny Glading (23)
- Assists: Danny Glading (15)
- Points: Danny Glading (38)
- Penalties in minutes: Ben Rubeor (5)
- Wins: Brian Phipps (4)
- Goals against average: Chris Garrity (11.38)

The 2011 Chesapeake Bayhawks season was the 11th season for the Chesapeake Bayhawks of Major League Lacrosse. The defending Steinfeld Cup champions fell in the playoffs to the Boston Cannons in the 2011 MLL semifinals.

== Off season ==
=== Draft ===
The Bayhawks acquired only 5 men from the 2011 MLL Draft.

Round	Pick	Name	Position	College
4	24	Barney Ehrmann	Defenseman	Georgetown
5	30	Steve DeNapoli	Defenseman	Hofstra
6	36	Michael Burns	Midfielder	North Carolina
7	42	Dan Hostetler	Defenseman	Georgetown
8	48	John Austin	Midfielder	Delaware

== Regular season ==
=== Schedule ===
Win	Loss

Date	Opponent	Stadium	Result	Attendance	Record
May 14	Rochester	Navy–Marine Corps Memorial Stadium	14-10	7,916	1-0
May 19	@ Hamilton	Ron Joyce Stadium	14-10	1,207	2-0
June 4	@ Boston	Harvard Stadium	17-13	10,727	2-1
June 4	@ Denver	Invesco Field	16-15 (OT)	12,548	3-1
June 16	@ Long Island	James M. Shuart Stadium	14-11	3,612	3-2
June 25	Boston	Navy–Marine Corps Memorial Stadium	17-10	8,370	3-3
July 2	Rochester	Navy–Marine Corps Memorial Stadium	13-11	8,410	4-3
July 16	@ Hamilton	Robert Joyce Stadium	12-11	1,103	5-3
July 23	Long Island	Navy–Marine Corps Memorial Stadium	15-8	7,793	5-4
July 30	Hamilton	Navy–Marine Corps Memorial Stadium	16-6	7,962	5-5
August 6	@ Rochester	Sahlen's Stadium	13-11	3,875	6-5
August 13	Denver	Navy–Marine Corps Memorial Stadium	15-9	8,517	6-6

== Postseason ==
The 2011 MLL playoffs were held at the Bayhawk's own Navy–Marine Corps Memorial Stadium on August 27 and 28. Despite having the home field advantage, 4-seeded Chesapeake fell to #1 Boston 14-13. It was a rematch of last year's semifinal game, which Chesapeake won 13-9.

=== Playoff Bracket ===
Semifinals
1	Boston	14
4	Chesapeake	13
2	Denver	9
3	Hamilton	11

Steinfeld Cup Final
1	Boston	10
3	Hamilton	9

=== Semifinal: Boston ===
Chesapeake Bayhawks vs. Boston Cannons

Quarter	1	2	3	4	Total
Chesapeake	3	3	2	5	13
Boston	1	4	4	5	14

at Navy–Marine Corps Memorial Stadium

- Date: August 27, 2011
- Game time: Noon
- Referee: Matt Palumb & Rich Tamberrino
