= Matt Striebel =

American lacrosse player (born 1979)

Personal information
- Nationality: American
- Born: January 12, 1979 (age 47) Gill, Massachusetts, U.S.
- Height: 6 ft 1 in (185 cm)
- Weight: 190 lb (86 kg; 13 st 8 lb)

Sport
- Position: Midfield
- NLL draft: 52nd overall, 2001; Philadelphia Wings
- NLL teams: Philadelphia Wings (2003); New York Saints (2003)* *appeared in no games
- MLL team Former teams: New York Lizards (2014–present); Bridgeport Barrage (2001–2003); Philadelphia Barrage (2004–2008); Chicago Machine/ Rochester Rattlers (2009–2013)
- Former NCAA team: Princeton University
- Pro career: 2001–

Career highlights
- College highlights: All-Ivy League Lacrosse (1st team: 2001; 2nd team: 1999 & 2000); All-Ivy League Soccer (honorable mention: 2000); Academic All-Ivy Soccer team (2000); All-American 2x (honorable mention: 2000 & 2001); USILA Scholar All-American (2001); NCAA Men's Lacrosse Championship (1998 & 2001); Professional highlights: Major League Lacrosse Steinfeld Cup Champion (2004, 2006 & 2007); Major League Lacrosse Championship MVP (2007); Major League Lacrosse All-Star (2005–2012); Major League Lacrosse All-Pro (2007 & 2008)
Medal record
Representing United States
Lacrosse
World Lacrosse Championship
Gold medal – first place	2002 Perth	Field lacrosse
Silver medal – second place	2006 London (Ontario)	Field lacrosse
Gold medal – first place	2010 Manchester	Field lacrosse

Matt Striebel (born January 12, 1979) is a former professional lacrosse midfielder who played professional field lacrosse in the Major League Lacrosse (MLL) for the New York Lizards and formerly played professional box lacrosse in the National Lacrosse League (NLL). He starred as a member of the Princeton Tigers men's lacrosse team from 1998 through 2001 and the Princeton Tigers men's soccer team from 1997 through 2000.

During his time at Princeton, the team qualified for the NCAA Men's Lacrosse Championship all four years, reached the championship game three times, won the championship game twice and won four Ivy League championships. He was a two-time honorable mention United States Intercollegiate Lacrosse Association (USILA) All-American and three-time All-Ivy League selection (once first team, twice second team). He was also an All-Ivy league performer in soccer and earned Princeton co-athlete of the year (all-sport) honors as a senior.

As a professional, he has earned three MLL championships, a league record eight MLL All-Star recognitions and an MLL championship game MVP award. He is also a three-time Team USA representative and two-time World Lacrosse Championship gold medalist.

In 2019, Striebel was elected to the National Lacrosse Hall of Fame.

== Background ==
Striebel is a native of Gill, Massachusetts. He first got involved in lacrosse at about the age of 12 or 13 when his sister brought home the Brine Lightning stick that he began to play with. Striebel attended The Hotchkiss School in Lakeville, Connecticut. Striebel first started playing lacrosse when he was a youth for Jeff Coulson, owner of Indoor Action Sports, in Greenfield, Massachusetts.

He also attended the Writers Workshop at The University of Iowa in Iowa City, Iowa, earning a Master of Fine Arts degree in 2007. He had earned a Bachelor of Arts degree in English at Princeton.

== College career ==
At Princeton he was a two-time honorable mention USILA All-American Team selection in 2000 and 2001. He was a second team All-Ivy League selection in 1999 and 2000 and a first team selection in 2001. He was a 2001 USILA Scholar All-American. During his four-year career, Princeton went undefeated in Ivy League Conference play with consecutive 6–0 records. Princeton was invited to the 1999 tournament, was a finalist in the 2000 tournament and earned championships in both the 1998 and 2001 tournaments, bringing the schools consecutive tournament invitations streak to twelve. In Striebel's 2001 senior season, the arrival of freshman Ryan Boyle necessitated that he move from attack to midfield. The move came the first practice after Princeton's 14–8 loss to Syracuse. Striebel had previously been orchestrating the Princeton offense from behind the goal, but on March 25, 2001, head coach Bill Tierney made the switch. During the 1998 season when Princeton won the NCAA title, Striebel had been playing midfield. Princeton went undefeated for the rest of the 2001 season after the switch.

During the 2000 NCAA tournament, Striebel scored two goals in the quarterfinals 10–7 victory against Maryland, and he added another in the 13–7 championship game loss to Syracuse. Striebel was one of the leading scorers on the team that season, and he was the team leader in assists entering the final four weekend. In the quarterfinals of the 2001 NCAA championship tournament, Striebel had an assist in the 8–7 victory over Loyola. In the 12–11 semifinal victory over Towson State, Striebel had a goal and an assist. Striebel scored twice in the 2001 championship game and also added two assists. He was selected to the All-tournament team.

Striebel was also an honorable mention All-Ivy League soccer player in 2000 as well as a 2000 Academic All-Ivy selection in soccer. As a junior, Striebel was a member of the 1999 Ivy League Champion Princeton Soccer team that earned an invitation to the 1999 NCAA Division I Men's Soccer Championship. The team posted a 10–5–2 (5–1–1 Ivy League) record.

As of 2010, Striebel ranks eighth on the Princeton Lacrosse career assists list and eleventh on the Princeton soccer career assists list. As a senior, he was honored as one of the three athletes of the year on campus (along with Dennis Norman and Scott Denbo)

== Professional career ==
Striebel began his career in the league's inaugural 2001 MLL season with the Bridgeport Barrage and stayed with the team as it remained in Bridgeport, Connecticut until the 2003 season. Then he moved with the franchise and played with the Philadelphia Barrage from 2004 through 2008. In 2009 MLL season, he joined the Chicago Machine and then became a member of the Rochester Rattlers for the 2011 MLL season. Striebel and Boyle were reunited for five seasons in Philadelphia. Striebel has helped the Barrage to win three Steinfeld Cup championships in 2004, 2006, and 2007. In the 2004 championship game, he scored what the Baltimore Sun described as the clinching goal in the 13–11 victory over the Boston Cannons. In the 2006 game, he had nine points (four goals, including one two-pointer and four assists). He was presented with the 2007 Steinfeld Cup Game Most Valuable Player Award. Striebel appeared in the 2005 & 2007 Major League Lacrosse All-Star Games. In the 2006 All-Star game he represented Team USA by scoring a goal and two assists. Striebel was an MLL All-Pro selection in 2007 and 2008. Striebel was an MLL All-Star in 2011. In 2012, Striebel set the MLL record for most All-Star games with eight (consecutive).

Striebel served as an assistant coach for Princeton Men's Lacrosse in 2005. Striebel also spent time assisting the men's lacrosse team at Iowa during his time there. As of 12 April 2012, Striebel currently coaches the Varsity Boys Lacrosse team at Northampton High School in Northampton, Massachusetts which is just south of his hometown. He also played professionally in 2012 and 2013.

In addition to his field lacrosse career, Striebel played one season in 2003 of box lacrosse with the Philadelphia Wings in the National Lacrosse League. Streibel was traded by the Wings to the New York Saints in February 2003. He never appeared in a game for the Saints. Striebel has also played professional soccer for the Western Massachusetts Pioneers.

Striebel has represented Team USA in the World Lacrosse Championship in 2002, 2006, and 2010. In the 2002 World Lacrosse Championship semifinal match against the Iroquois Nation, Striebel scored a goal in the 18–8 victory. Striebel also serves as a representative of Trilogy Lacrosse.

On November 11, 2013, Striebel was traded to the New York Lizards.

== Statistics ==
=== MLL ===
		Regular Season							Playoffs
Season	Team	GP	G	2ptG	A	Pts	LB	PIM	GP	G	2ptG	A	Pts	LB	PIM
2001	Bridgeport	8	4	0	8	12	10	0	--	--	--	--	--	--	--
2002	Bridgeport	9	10	0	5	15	22	0	2	2	0	1	3	4	0
2003	Bridgeport	12	16	0	2	18	19	0	--	--	--	--	--	--	--
2004	Philadelphia	12	15	0	12	27	14	0.5	2	2	0	1	3	4	0
2005	Philadelphia	12	22	0	13	35	25	0.5	--	--	--	--	--	--	--
2006	Philadelphia	11	23	0	12	35	29	0	2	9	1	5	15	2	0
2007	Philadelphia	12	25	1	13	39	22	0	2	5	0	4	9	4	0
2008	Philadelphia	12	31	0	11	42	21	0	1	2	0	0	2	1	0
2009	Chicago	12	13	1	8	22	18	1.5	--	--	--	--	--	--	--
2010	Chicago	10	12	0	5	17	14	0	--	--	--	--	--	--	--
2011	Rochester	12	13	4	8	25	16	3.0	--	--	--	--	--	--	--
2012	Rochester	14	14	8	10	32	13	0.5	--	--	--	--	--	--	--
MLL Totals		122	184	6	97	287	210	2.5	7	18	1	10	29	11	0

=== Princeton University ===
Season	GP	G	A	Pts	PPG
1998	15	1	4	5	--
1999	13	11	24	35	--
2000	15	12	27	39	--
2001	15	19	19	38	--
Totals	58	43	74	117	--

Preceded by Roy Colsey	Major League Lacrosse Championship Game MVP; 2007	Succeeded by Joe Walters
