= 2010 Chesapeake Bayhawks season =

Major League Lacrosse season

2010 Chesapeake Bayhawks
- Major League Lacrosse Champions
- League: Major League Lacrosse
- Division: 4th MLL
- 2010 record: 6-6
- Home record: 3-3
- Road record: 3-3
- Goals for: 161
- Goals against: 158
- Coach: John Tucker (10 games); Brendan Kelly (2 regular and 2 playoff games)
- Arena: Navy–Marine Corps Memorial Stadium

Team leaders
- Goals: Peet Poillon (24)
- Assists: Peet Poillon (15)
- Points: Peet Poillon (41)
- Penalties in minutes: Ben Rubeor (5.5)
- Wins: Chris Garrity (6)
- Goals against average: Chris Garrity (12.92)

The 2010 Chesapeake Bayhawks season was the 10th season for the Chesapeake Bayhawks of the Major League Lacrosse, and their 1st season as Chesapeake. The Bayhawks won their 3rd Steinfeld Cup, despite entering the playoffs as the lowest seed.

== Regular season ==
=== Standings ===
W = Wins, L = Losses, PCT = Winning Percentage, GB = Games Back of first place, GF = Goals For, 2ptGF = 2 point Goals For, GA = Goals Against, 2ptGA = 2 point Goals Against

Qualified for playoffs

Team	W	L	PCT	GB	GF	2ptGF	GA	2ptGA
Boston Cannons	8	4	.667	-	174	15	141	10
Denver Outlaws	8	4	.667	-	158	9	148	10
Long Island Lizards	7	5	.583	1	141	9	139	12
Chesapeake Bayhawks	6	6	.500	2	161	18	158	8
Chicago Machine	4	8	.333	4	157	4	171	11
Toronto Nationals	3	9	.250	5	132	8	166	12

=== Schedule ===
Win	Loss

Date	Opponent	Stadium	Result	Attendance	Record
May 15	Long Island	Navy–Marine Corps Memorial Stadium	16-8	4,800	1-0
May 22	@ Toronto	Lamport Stadium	25-12	3,921	2-0
May 30	@ Chicago	Joe Walton Stadium	17-14	2,513	2-1
June 4	Boston	Navy–Marine Corps Memorial Stadium	17-14	3,183	3-1
June 12	@ Toronto	Lamport Stadium	10-9	2,145	4-1
June 19	Denver	Navy–Marine Corps Memorial Stadium	20-16	3,483	4-2
June 24	Toronto	Navy–Marine Corps Memorial Stadium	17-14	3,588	4-3
July 4	@ Denver	Invesco Field	12-10	23,433	4-4
July 10	Boston	Navy–Marine Corps Memorial Stadium	16-10	4,123	4-5
July 22	@ Long Island	James M. Shuart Stadium	14-11	3,522	4-6
July 31	Chicago	Navy–Marine Corps Memorial Stadium	20-12	7,297	5-6
August 7	@ Boston	Harvard Stadium	16-15 (OT)	8,161	6-6

== Postseason ==
Ranked the 4th seed heading into the 2010 MLL playoffs, Chesapeake upset #1 Boston in the semifinals 13-9, and defeated Long Island in the MLL championship 13-9 again for the Steinfeld Cup.

=== Playoff Bracket ===
Semifinals
1	Boston Cannons	9
4	Chesapeake Bayhawks	13
2	Denver Outlaws	12
3	Long Island Lizards	16

Steinfeld Cup Final
4	Chesapeake Bayhawks	13
3	Long Island Lizards	9

=== Semifinal: Boston ===
Chesapeake Bayhawks vs. Boston Cannons

Quarter	1	2	3	4	Total
Chesapeake	4	6	2	1	13
Boston	2	1	4	2	9

at Navy–Marine Corps Memorial Stadium

- Date: August 21, 2010
- Game time: Noon
- Game attendance: 6,319
- Referee: Rich Tamberrino and Steve Miller

=== Final: Long Island ===
Chesapeake Bayhawks vs. Long Island Lizards

Quarter	1	2	3	4	Total
Chesapeake	2	2	4	5	13
Long Island	3	1	4	1	9

at Navy–Marine Corps Memorial Stadium

- Date: August 22, 2010
- Game time: 1:00 PM
- Game attendance: 6,445
- Referee: Rich Tamberrino and Tom Slutton

== See also ==
- 2010 MLL season
- Chesapeake Bayhawks
