= Greg Cattrano =

American lacrosse player

Personal information
- Nickname: The Cat
- Nationality: American
- Born: August 6, 1975 (age 51)

Sport
- Position: Goalkeeper
- NLL teams: New York Saints
- MLL teams: Baltimore Bayhawks; Philadelphia Barrage; Long Island Lizards
- NCAA team: Brown University

Greg "The Cat" Cattrano (born August 6, 1975) is a retired lacrosse goaltender, who is recognized as one of the most successful and accomplished goaltenders in the history of the sport.

== High school career ==
Cattrano played for Ward Melville High School where he was an All-American in his senior season. His 1992 team won the New York State Lacrosse Championship. In 1993 he was awarded the Lt. Ray Enners Award as Suffolk County's outstanding lacrosse player.

== Collegiate career ==
Cattrano attended Brown University. In 1997, his senior year, he was named NCAA Goalie of the Year, All-Ivy League, All-New England, and Brown Bears Team MVP. In addition he was named All-American twice. Cattrano finished his collegiate career with an amazing 68% save percentage, and his three goals still stand as the NCAA record for offensive production by a goaltender in NCAA sports.

== NLL career ==
Cattrano played three seasons indoors for the New York Saints of the National Lacrosse League (1998–2000), posting a 13.68 goals against average in seven career games.

== MLL career ==
Cattrano played in all five of the league's first Championship Games from 2001 to 2005, winning the Steinfeld Cup in 2002 and 2004. His leadership skills helped guide the Barrage from a 1–11 record in 2003, to champions in 2004. Cattrano has won the Major League Lacrosse Goaltender of the Year Award three times, and was named Major League Lacrosse MVP in 2002. Cattrano was also voted to the Inaugural All-MLL Team, and started in multiple Major League Lacrosse All-Star Game. Though his career, Cattrano was extremely durable. In 2004, he was the only goalie in the MLL to play every minute of every game.

Cattrano is the league's goalie leader in wins, boasting an incredible 40–19 record, including playoff games. He has saved 58% of the 1,611 shots he has faced in his career, and has a league-best 13.4 goals against average.

In 2004, Cattrano became the first goalkeeper to score in an MLL game, tallying his first professional goal against the Rochester Rattlers in a 19–15 win at Villanova Stadium. Cattrano also achieved the feat four times in his college career at Brown University, twice playing for NYAC club lacrosse, and six times in high school.

Cattrano originally played for the Baltimore Bayhawks for first three years of the league's existence, before being traded to the Philadelphia Barrage for the first overall pick in the 2004 Collegiate Draft (Baltimore selected Michael Powell). The Long Island Lizards acquired Cattrano, March 29, 2005, sending Philadelphia native Brian Dougherty to the Barrage in an exchange of the top two goaltenders in the league.

Cattrano retired after the 2006 season, and his number "2" was retired by the Long Island Lizards in the 2007.

Prior to the MLL forming, Cattrano played club lacrosse for NYAC and represented Team USA in the 1999 World Lacrosse Championship.

== Awards ==
Preceded by Brian Dougherty	Ensign C. Markland Kelly, Jr. Award; 1997	Succeeded by Brian Carcaterra
Preceded by None	Major League Lacrosse Goaltender of the Year; 2001, 2002	Succeeded by Brian Dougherty
Preceded by Ryan Powell	Major League Lacrosse MVP; 2002	Succeeded by Jay Jalbert
Preceded by Brian Dougherty	Major League Lacrosse Goaltender of the Year; 2004	Succeeded by Chris Garrity
Preceded by Kevin Lowe	New Balance Major League Lacrosse; Championship Game MVP; 2004	Succeeded by Gary Gait
