= Jesse Hubbard =

Lacrosse player (born 1975)

Personal information
- Nationality: American
- Born: September 18, 1975 (age 50)
- Height: 6 ft 1 in (185 cm)
- Weight: 215 lb (98 kg; 15 st 5 lb)

Sport
- Position: Attack
- Shoots: Right
- NLL draft: 13th overall, 1998; Baltimore Thunder
- NLL teams: Baltimore Thunder (1999); Pittsburgh CrosseFire (2000); Washington Power (2001)
- MLL teams: New Jersey Pride (2001–2007); Los Angeles Riptide (2008); Washington Bayhawks (2009)* *appeared in no games
- NCAA team: Princeton University
- Pro career: 1999–

Career highlights
- College highlights: Men's Ivy League Player of the Year (1996); Men's Ivy League Rookie of the Year (1995); All-American 3x (1st team: 1996 & 1998; 2nd team: 1997); NCAA Men's Lacrosse Championship (1996, 1997 & 1998); Records: Princeton career goals (163, 1998–present); Princeton single-season goals (53, 1996–present); Princeton single-season points (72, 1996–1997); Princeton freshman goals (23, 1995–1999); Professional highlights: Major League Lacrosse Single-season goals leader (2001, 2002 & 2003); Major League Lacrosse All-Time goals leader (2001–2005, 2008–2010); National Lacrosse League Rookie of the Year (1999)
Medal record
Representing United States
Lacrosse
World Lacrosse Championship
Gold medal – first place	1998 Baltimore	Field lacrosse

Jesse Hubbard (born September 18, 1975) is a former professional lacrosse player who played professional box lacrosse in the National Lacrosse League (NLL) and professional field lacrosse in the Major League Lacrosse (MLL).

== Background ==
Hubbard starred as a member of the Princeton Tigers men's lacrosse team from 1995 through 1998, where he earned Ivy League Player of the Year, Ivy League Rookie of the Year, three All-American recognitions from the United States Intercollegiate Lacrosse Association (USILA), four Ivy League championships, and three national championships. He holds Princeton's lacrosse scoring records for both career and single-season goals. In high school, he had set the Interstate Athletic Conference (IAC) scoring record, while playing for St. Albans School and becoming The Washington Post boys' lacrosse player of the year.

As a professional, he was the MLL's leading goal scorer for its first three seasons and its all-time goal leader as recently as the 2010 MLL season. His 54 goals in 2002 continue to be a league single-season record. He is a five-time Major League Lacrosse All-Star. In August 2010, he was selected to the MLL 10th Anniversary team. He has represented Team USA in the World Lacrosse Championships and is an ambassador of the sport both through service with Warrior Sports and his own annual youth camps.

Hubbard got his first lacrosse stick when he was 11 or 12 years old. Hubbard played middle and high school lacrosse at St. Albans School (Washington, D.C.)., where he was a captain and earned All-Metropolitan and All-American honors. The Washington Post named Hubbard to the 1993 All-Met Boys' Lacrosse First Team as a midfielder after he led the IAC in goals with 59 as a junior. Then, when as a senior Hubbard became the All-time IAC goal scorer with 217, they named him the 1994 All-Met Boys' Lacrosse Team Player of the Year.

== College career ==
When Hubbard went to Princeton, he was expected to be one of the key incoming midfielders. Hubbard became was part of a trio of revered attackmen who were Princeton classmates along with Jon Hess and Chris Massey. As starters, the trio of All-Americans, which retired second (Hess), third (Hubbard) and fourth (Massey) in career points at Princeton, had a 43–2 record and combined for 618 points. He was a first team USILA All-American Team selection in 1996 and 1998 and second team selection in 1997. He was also first team All-Ivy League in 1996 (when he was Ivy League Player of the Year), 1997 and 1998 and a second team selection in 1995 (when he was named Ivy League Rookie of the Year). The 1995 team, which earned the school's sixth consecutive NCAA Men's Lacrosse Championship invitation, was Ivy League co-champion, while the 1996–1998 teams were 6–0 undefeated outright conference champions. These undefeated league champions won the 1996, 1997 and 1998 NCAA Division I Men's Lacrosse Championships, becoming the first team to threepeat since Syracuse from 1988–90 and the first to be recognized to have done so without an NCAA scandal since Johns Hopkins from 1978–80.

In 1996, he earned co-Ivy League Player of the year by recording six or more goals four times during the regular season. In the 1996 NCAA Division I Men's Lacrosse Championship tournament quarterfinals 22–6 victory over Towson State, Hubbard again scored six goals. Hubbard added three more goals in the championship game against Virginia including the first goal and the final goal in overtime of the 13–12 victory. In the 1997 NCAA Division I Men's Lacrosse Championship tournament quarterfinals, he again scored six goals in an 11–9 victory over the UMass. He scored in the semifinal 10–9 victory over Duke, and he scored four goals in the 19–7 championship victory against Maryland. The 1997 team is regarded as the best in school history with a record number of wins during its 15–0 season. He served as co-captain of the 1998 team. He scored three goals in the 1998 NCAA Division I Men's Lacrosse Championship tournament 11–10 semifinal victory over Syracuse. He also scored four goals and added six assists in the 15–5 championship game victory over Maryland.

When Hubbard was on the field, the Princeton offense was explosive. Hubbard holds the Princeton University single-season (53, 1996) and career (163, 1995–98) goals records. He also broke Kevin Lowe's school single-season points record of 69 in 1996 by three, but Hess broke the record in 1997 with 76 points. Hubbard's 23 goals as a freshman was a Princeton freshman record until B. J. Prager posted 25 in 1999. Hubbard threatened the Ivy League record for career goals in conference games needing just eight in his final two games, but as of 2010, Jon Reese's 1990 record remained on the books. He was named number 11 of the top 20 athletes in Princeton Tiger history by the Daily Princetonian.

== Professional career ==
Hubbard represented Team USA in the 1998 World Lacrosse Championship. Hubbard also played in the National Lacrosse League for the Baltimore Thunder (1999), Pittsburgh CrosseFire (2000) and Washington Power (2001). In 1999, he was named NLL Rookie of the Year. In the 1999 World Cup, Hubbard scored a goal to give Team USA and 8–7 lead over Team Canada in a 20–10 victory to sweep the event.

Hubbard was a member of the New Jersey Pride from 2001 until 2007. Prior to the 2008 MLL season, Hubbard was traded to the Los Angeles Riptide in exchange for a first round 2009 MLL Collegiate Draft pick. Hubbard played for the Los Angeles Riptide during the 2008 season. After the 2008 season, Hubbard was assigned to the Washington Bayhawks (now Chesapeake Bayhawks). Prior to the start of the 2009 season with the Bayhawks, Hubbard suffered a herniated disc and was unable to play the 2009 season. Hubbard has not played in the MLL since.

In 2000, the MLL organized a Major League Lacrosse Summer Showcase, which was a seven-game promotional series to introduce the first outdoor professional lacrosse league set to begin play the following year. Hubbard was one of the 40 players selected to promote the league. When the MLL began its first season in 2001, Hubbard was instrumental in marketing the league looking to showcase premium talent. Hubbard led the MLL in scoring each season from 2001 to 2003, and was named to the MLL All-Star Team 2001, 2002, 2003, 2005, 2006. In the 2002 All-Star game he scored a goal to break a 16–16 tie in a 21–16 victory for the National Division All-Stars over the American Division All-Stars. When he surpassed his 2001 total of 44 goals with 54 at the end of the 2002 season, it established a league single-season goals record that continues to survive through the 2010 MLL season and his 2003 season total of 50 goals continues to be the only other 50-goal season in league history. The MLL schedule was reduced from 14 games to 12 in 2003, meaning that Hubbard's 50 goals is the record for a 12-game season. The closest anyone has come to his single-season goal scoring record was John Grant's 47-goal 2008 season. As a result of having been the goals scored leader for the MLL's first three-season, he built up a career goals scored lead that stood up until during the 2005 season when Mark Millon took a 206–193 lead in career goals scored. However, Millon only scored five goals in 2007 when his career came to an end. In July 2008, Hubbard surpassed Millon's career total of 239 by reaching 247. On August 1, 2010, Tim Goettelmann surpassed Hubbard with his 246th, 247th and 248th career goals. In August 2010, Hubbard was selected to the MLL 10th anniversary team.

Hubbard is a spokesman for Warrior Sports and annually runs the Jesse Hubbard Experience, a youth lacrosse camp for boys ages 9–17 held each summer at George Mason University.

== Personal ==
Hubbard has an older brother named Andy. Andy was a midfielder on the 1992 and 1994 teams that earned Princeton's first two NCAA Men's Lacrosse Championships.

== Statistics ==
=== NLL ===
		Regular Season						Playoffs
Season	Team	GP	G	A	Pts	LB	PIM	GP	G	A	Pts	LB	PIM
1999	Baltimore	7	14	15	29	37	2	1	1	4	5	2	2
2000	Pittsburgh	11	17	22	39	66	16	--	--	--	--	--	--
2001	Washington	14	33	21	54	76	29	1	0	0	0	5	2
NLL totals		32	64	58	122	179	47	2	1	4	5	7	4

=== MLL ===
		Regular Season							Playoffs
Season	Team	GP	G	2ptG	A	Pts	LB	PIM	GP	G	2ptG	A	Pts	LB	PIM
2001	New Jersey	14	44	3	6	53	34	6.5	0	0	0	0	0	0	0
2002	New Jersey	14	54	4	9	67	38	3.5	1	1	0	0	1	3	0.5
2003	New Jersey	12	50	1	13	64	18	5	1	2	0	0	2	5	0
2004	New Jersey	11	35	5	8	48	16	1	0	0	0	0	0	0	0
2005	New Jersey	9	11	1	8	20	12	0	0	0	0	0	0	0	0
2006	New Jersey	12	17	1	20	38	12	1	0	0	0	0	0	0	0
2007	New Jersey	11	11	0	10	21	13	0	0	0	0	0	0	0	0
2008	Los Angeles	11	26	1	14	41	20	1.5	1	1	0	1	2	0	0
MLL Totals		94	248	16	88	352	163	18.5	3	4	0	1	5	8	0.5

=== Princeton University ===
Season	GP	G	A	Pts	PPG
1995	12	23	5	28	--
1996	15	53	19	72	4.8
1997	13	41	15	56	4.3
1998	15	46	9	55	3.7
Totals	57	163	48	211	3.70

== Awards and achievements ==
Preceded by Colin Doyle	NLL Rookie of the Year; 1999	Succeeded by John Grant Jr.
Preceded by David Evans	Men's Ivy League Player of the Year; 1996 with Mike Eckert	Succeeded by Jon Hess
Preceded by Brian Merritt	Men's Ivy League Rookie of the Year; 1995	Succeeded by Joe Pilch
Preceded by Inaugural season	Major League Lacrosse season goals leader 2001, 2002, 2003	Succeeded by Blake Miller
Preceded by New league Mark Millon	Major League Lacrosse all-time career goals leader 2001–2005; July 27, 2008 – August 1, 2010	Succeeded by Mark Millon; Tim Goettelmann
Preceded by New league Self	Major League Lacrosse all-time single-season goals leader 2001 (44); 2002 – present (54)	Succeeded by self current
