= 2008 Major League Lacrosse season =

2008 MLL season
- League: Major League Lacrosse
- Sport: Field lacrosse
- Duration: May 2008 – August 2008
- Teams: 10

MLL seasons
- ← 2007 season 2009 season →

The 2008 Major League Lacrosse season was the eighth season of the league. The season began on May 17, 2008, and concluded with the championship game on August 24, 2008.

== Milestones and events ==
=== Pre-season ===
- Following the 2007 MLL season, the league saw a number of head coaching changes:
  - Chicago Machine Assistant Coach John Combs was promoted to the team's new head coach, following the resignation of former head coach, Lelan Rodgers. Rodgers, stepped down from the position to accept an assistant coaching position at Syracuse University.
  - Washington Bayhawks hired former Bayhawks player, and head coach of the Denver Outlaws, Jared Testa to lead the team. Scott Hiller, two-time winner of the Major League Lacrosse Coach of the Year Award remains with the team as general manager.
  - San Francisco Dragons hired Tom Slate to be the team's head coach. Slate had been an assistant coach with the Philadelphia Barrage.
- There were also a number of trades and player announcements in the off-season:
  - January 23, 2008: The Los Angeles Riptide traded team captain Matt Ogelsby and midfielder Garrett Wilson to the San Francisco Dragons for United States Naval Academy graduate Ben Bailey.
  - March 3, 2008: The Chicago Machine traded midfielder Zach Heffner and hard-hitting defenseman Steve Panarelli to the San Francisco Dragons, for Mitch Hendler and Greg Rommel.
  - March 4, 2008:Washington Bayhawks midfielder, and former Ivy League Player of the Year and 2006 McLaughlin Award co-winner, Joe Boulukos announced his retirement
  - March 11, 2008:The Boston Cannons traded David Mitchell and a draft pick to the San Francisco Dragons, for defenseman Colin Hulme and attackman Matt Alrich.
  - March 13, 2008: The San Francisco Dragons traded former Major League Lacrosse Offensive Player of the Year Award and MVP Ryan Powell, and midfielder Nate Watkins, to the Denver Outlaws in exchange for a first round and second round pick in the 2008 MLL Collegiate Draft.
  - May 2, 2008: The New Jersey Pride traded Princeton University all-time leading goal scorer Jesse Hubbard to the Los Angeles Riptide in exchange for a first round 2009 MLL Collegiate Draft pick.

=== Regular season ===
- The San Francisco Dragons moved their home games to Spartan Stadium in San Jose, California from Kezar Stadium in San Francisco.
- The Washington Bayhawks moved their home games to George Mason Stadium in Fairfax, Virginia from Georgetown University's Multi-Sport Field in Washington.
- The Philadelphia Barrage played the 2008 season as a travelling team. Their "home games" were played in Virginia Beach, Virginia; Irving, Texas; Saint Louis, Missouri; Cary, North Carolina; Boston, Massachusetts and Hillsboro, Oregon.
- May 28: Major League Lacrosse held its annual Collegiate Draft. Paul Rabil was selected with the first overall pick by the Boston Cannons.
- June 10: Casey Powell became the all-time leading scorer in Major League Lacrosse eclipsing Mark Millon's mark.
- June 23: The Washington Bayhawks traded midfielder Bill McGlone and a draft pick, to the San Francisco Dragons in exchange for Jarrett Park and Hunter Lochte.
- July 27: Jesse Hubbard became the all-time leading goal leader in Major League Lacrosse eclipsing Mark Millon's mark.
- August 4: Kevin Huntley of the Los Angeles Riptide set a record for goals scored by a rookie breaking Adam Doneger's mark set in 2003.

=== Post-season ===
- August 24: The Rochester Rattlers win their first MLL championship with a 16–6 win over the Denver Outlaws in Boston.

== Standings ==
W = Wins, L = Losses, PCT = Winning Percentage, GF = Goals For, 2ptGF = 2 point Goals For, GA = Goals Against, 2ptGA = 2 point Goals Against

Final

Qualified for playoffs

Eastern Conference
Team	W	L	PCT	GF	2ptGF	GA	2ptGA
Rochester Rattlers	9	3	.750	202	5	161	4
Philadelphia Barrage	7	5	.583	166	6	173	5
Boston Cannons	7	5	.583	182	7	166	8
New Jersey Pride	6	6	.500	171	4	179	3
Long Island Lizards	5	7	.417	188	6	194	8
Washington Bayhawks	4	8	.333	156	7	187	3

Western Conference
Team	W	L	PCT	GF	2ptGF	GA	2ptGA
Denver Outlaws	8	4	.667	173	7	160	4
Los Angeles Riptide	7	5	.583	173	2	157	8
San Francisco Dragons	4	8	.333	149	8	173	7
Chicago Machine	3	9	.250	158	4	168	6

Los Angeles finished ahead of Philadelphia based on head-to-head record of 1–0. Philadelphia finished ahead of Boston based on head-to-head record of 2–0.

== All Star Game ==
The 2008 MLL All-Star Game was played on July 17 at INVESCO Field at Mile High in Denver, Colorado. The Western Conference team won 31-15. Ryan Powell of Denver was named the game Most Valuable Player.

Eastern Conference All-Stars	Western Conference All-Stars
Attack
Spencer Ford (Long Island Lizards)	Jake Byrne (San Francisco Dragons)
John Grant, Jr. (Rochester Rattlers)	Kevin Leveille (Chicago Machine)
Mikey Powell (Boston Cannons)	Brendan Mundorf (Denver Outlaws)
Merrick Thomson (New Jersey Pride)	Ryan Powell (Denver Outlaws)
Midfield
Stephen Berger (Long Island Lizards)	Steven Brooks (Chicago Machine)
Kyle Dixon (Washington Bayhawks)	Greg Downing (Los Angeles Riptide)
Chris Fiore (Long Island Lizards)	Benson Erwin (Denver Outlaws)
Shawn Nadelen (Washington Bayhawks)	Matt Hanna (Denver Outlaws)
Matt Poskay (Boston Cannons)	Kyle Harrison (Los Angeles Riptide)
Paul Rabil (Boston Cannons)	Brian Langtry (Denver Outlaws)
Matt Striebel (Philadelphia Barrage)	Jeff Sonke (Denver Outlaws)
Joe Walters (Rochester Rattlers)	Chazz Woodson (Los Angeles Riptide)
Face-Off
Peter Vlahakis (Long Island Lizards)	Anthony Kelly (Los Angeles Riptide)
Defense
Brodie Merrill (Rochester Rattlers)	D.J. Driscoll (Los Angeles Riptide)
Chris Passavia (Boston Cannons)	Brett Hughes (Los Angeles Riptide)
Nick Polanco (Long Island Lizards)	Eric Martin (San Francisco Dragons)
Kyle Sweeney (Philadelphia Barrage)	Lee Zink (Denver Outlaws)
Goalkeeper
Chris Garrity (Washington Bayhawks)	Mike Gabel (Chicago Machine)
Rob Scherr (New Jersey Pride)	Jesse Schwartzman (Denver Outlaws)
Coaches
Bill Daye (Boston Cannons)	Brian Reese (Denver Outlaws)
Tony Resch (Philadelphia Barrage)	Denver Outlaws coaching staff

== Playoffs ==
The 2008 NB Zip Major League Lacrosse Championship Weekend took place on August 23 and 24 at Harvard Stadium in Boston, Massachusetts. The semifinals took place on August 23 and the final was on August 24.

Semifinals
4	Philadelphia	15
1	Rochester	16 ^{OT}
3	Los Angeles	12
2	Denver	13

Steinfeld Cup Final
2	Denver	6
1	Rochester	16

Joe Walters was named MVP for the playoffs

== Awards ==
=== Weekly awards ===
The MLL gives out awards weekly for the best offensive player, best defensive player, best goalkeeper, and best rookie.

Month	Week	Offensive	Defensive	Goalkeeper	Rookie
May	1	Jeff Zywicki	Geoff Snider	Mike Gabel	N/A
May	2	John Grant, Jr.	J.J. Morrissey	Brian Dougherty	N/A
May	3	John Grant, Jr.	Peter Vlahakis	Mickey Jarboe	Mike Leveille
June	4	Kyle Dixon	Peter Vlahakis	Chris Garrity	Mike Podgajny
June	5	Brian Langtry	Nicky Polanco	Rob Scherr	Matt Danowski
June	6	Casey Powell	Ryan McClay	Rob Scherr	Paul Rabil
June	7	Michael Powell	Peter Vlahakis	Brian Dougherty	Kevin Huntley
July	8	Merrick Thomson	Peter Vlahakis	Brian Dougherty	Kevin Huntley
July	9	Matt Poskay	Brett Moyer	Mike Levin	Kevin Huntley
July	10	Matt Brown	Brodie Merrill	Kip Turner	Mike Leveille
July	11	John Grant, Jr.	Greg Gurenlian	Mickey Jarboe	Stephen Peyser
August	12	Kevin Huntley	Ryan McClay	Kevin Keenan	Brett Queener
August	13	Andrew Combs	Alex Smith	Matt Vallone	Stephen Peyser

=== Annual awards ===
Award	Winner	Team
MVP Award	John Grant, Jr.	Rochester
Rookie of the Year Award	Kevin Huntley	Los Angeles
Coach of the Year Award	Tony Resch	Philadelphia
Defensive player of the Year Award	Brodie Merrill	Rochester
Offensive player of the Year Award	John Grant, Jr	Rochester
Goaltender of the Year Award	Mickey Jarboe	Los Angeles
Sportsman of the Year Award	Tom Zummo	Boston
Most Improved Player of the Year Award	Merrick Thomson	New Jersey
