= Josh Sims =

Josh Sims may refer to:

- Josh Sims (lacrosse)
- Josh Sims (footballer)
