= 2015 MLL All-Star Game =

2015 MLL All-Star
- Event: 2015 Major League Lacrosse season
MLL Gladiators	MLL Cowboys
27	15
- Recap
- Date: June 13, 2015
- Venue: BBVA Compass Stadium, Houston, Texas
- Coca Cola Player MVP: Jeremy Boltus (ROC)
- Attendance: 10,084
- Weather: 85°F (29°C)

The 2015 Major League Lacrosse All-Star Game took place on June 13, 2015 at BBVA Compass Stadium, the home of MLS club Houston Dynamo and NWSL club Houston Dash. The 2015 MLL All-Star Game was the first professional lacrosse game ever played in Texas. The game was televised live on CBS Sports Network in the United States.
