= Brian Dougherty =

American lacrosse player and coach

Personal information
- Nationality: American
- Born: December 10, 1973 (age 52) Philadelphia, Pennsylvania, U.S.
- Height: 6 ft 1 in (185 cm)
- Weight: 202 lb (92 kg; 14 st 6 lb)

Sport
- Position: Goalie
- NLL draft: 2nd overall, 1996; Baltimore Thunder
- NLL teams: Philadelphia Wings; Baltimore Thunder
- MLL team Former teams: Philadelphia Barrage; Long Island Lizards; Rochester Rattlers
- NCAA team: University of Maryland; Head coach Chestnut Hill College
- Pro career: 2001–2007
Medal record
Representing United States
Men's lacrosse
World Lacrosse Championship
| Winner | 1998 Baltimore |

Brian "Doc" Dougherty (born December 10, 1973) is a retired Hall of Fame American lacrosse goaltender. He attended The Episcopal Academy before attending University of Maryland. He is currently the head coach at Springside Chestnut Hill Academy.

== Overview ==
Dougherty is one of the most decorated and accomplished goaltenders in the history of lacrosse. He is a three-time recipient of the Major League Lacrosse Goaltender of the Year Award, and was awarded the Ensign C. Markland Kelly, Jr. Award in back to back years in as the NCAA Goaltender of the Year.

In 1995, with the Terrapins, Dougherty was named the NCAA tournament MVP. Dougherty was selected to the National Lacrosse Hall of Fame in 2012.

== MLL career ==
Dougherty played with the Philadelphia Barrage from 2005 to 2008, played with the Long Island Lizards from 2003 to 2004 and Rochester Rattlers from 2001 to 2002.

Dougherty has been part of three Steinfeld Cup Championship teams: the Long Island Lizards in 2001, the Philadelphia Barrage in 2006, and again in 2007. He has appeared in many Major League Lacrosse All-Star Games

He was also the starting goalie for 1998 United States Lacrosse team that won the World Lacrosse Championship.

=== Professional Lacrosse Hall of Fame ===
On June 18, 2022, Dougherty was inducted into the Professional Lacrosse Hall of Fame as one of the eleven members of the inaugural class of inductees.

== NLL career ==
Dougherty has also played box lacrosse in the National Lacrosse League for the Philadelphia Wings and the Baltimore Thunder, though he played sparingly.

== Coaching career ==
Dougherty coached Division II Chestnut Hill College from 2011 to 2017 prior to becoming the head coach at Springside Chestnut Hill Academy.

== Statistics ==
=== MLL ===
| | | Regular Season | | | | | | | Playoffs |
| Year | Team | GP | Min | GA | GAA | Sv | SvPct | 2ptGA | GP | Min | GA | GAA | Sv | SvPct | 2ptGA |
|---|---|---|---|---|---|---|---|---|---|---|---|---|---|---|---|
| 2001 | Rochester | 14 | 844 | 164 | 11.7% | 216 | 56.8% | 6 | 1 | 65 | 13 | 12.0% | 10 | 43.5% | 0 |
| 2002 | Rochester | 13 | 768 | 153 | 12.0% | 197 | 56.3% | 8 | - | - | - | - | - | - | - |
| 2003 | Long Island | 10 | 536 | 115 | 12.9% | 160 | 58.2% | 6 | 2 | 120 | 27 | 13.5% | 46 | 63.0% | 1 |
| 2004 | Long Island | 12 | 697 | 183 | 15.8% | 267 | 59.3% | 11 | - | - | - | - | - | - | - |
| 2005 | Philadelphia | 10 | 556 | 135 | 14.6% | 185 | 57.4% | 5 | - | - | - | - | - | - | - |
| 2006 | Philadelphia | 12 | 651 | 126 | 11.6% | 212 | 62.7% | 3 | 2 | 116 | 22 | 11.3% | 34 | 60.7% | 2 |
| 2007 | Philadelphia | 12 | 672 | 132 | 11.8% | 182 | 58.0% | 4 | 2 | 94 | 20 | 12.8% | 28 | 58.3% | 0 |
| MLL Totals | | 83 | 4,724 | 1008 | - | 1,416 | - | 43 | 7 | 395 | 82 | - | 118 | - | 3 |

=== NLL ===
| | | Regular Season | | | | | | Playoffs |
| Season | Team | GP | Min | GA | SV | GAA | SV% | GP | Min | GA | SV | GAA | SV% |
|---|---|---|---|---|---|---|---|---|---|---|---|---|---|
| 1998 | Baltimore | 3 | 29 | 8 | 14 | 16.55 | 63.64 | 1 | 2 | 0 | 0 | 0 | 0 |
| 2000 | Philadelphia | 0 | 0 | 0 | 0 | 0 | 0 | -- | -- | -- | -- | -- | -- |
| NLL totals | | 3 | 29 | 8 | 14 | 16.55 | 63.64 | 1 | 2 | 0 | 0 | 0 | 0 |

== See also ==
- Maryland Terrapins men's lacrosse
- Lacrosse in Pennsylvania

== Awards ==
| Preceded by Scott Bacigalupo | Ensign C. Markland Kelly, Jr. Award; 1995 & 1996 | Succeeded by Greg Cattrano |
| Preceded by Greg Cattrano | Major League Lacrosse Goaltender of the Year; 2003 | Succeeded by Greg Cattrano |
| Preceded by Chris Garrity | Major League Lacrosse Goaltender of the Year; 2006 & 2007 | Succeeded by Incumbent |
