= 2012 Chesapeake Bayhawks season =

Major League Lacrosse season

2012 Chesapeake Bayhawks
- Major League Lacrosse Champions
- League: Major League Lacrosse
- Division: 2nd MLL
- 2012 record: 10–4
- Home record: 5–2
- Road record: 5–2
- Coach: Dave Cottle
- Arena: Navy–Marine Corps Memorial Stadium

The 2012 Chesapeake Bayhawks season is the 12th season for the Chesapeake Bayhawks of Major League Lacrosse. The Bayhawks were looking to rebound after a semifinal loss in the 2011 MLL playoffs to Boston.

== Off-season ==
=== Draft ===
The first Chesapeake Bayhawk to be drafted in 2012 was long-stick midfielder C.J. Costabile. He was the 5th overall pick, and netted 15 goals and 16 assists for 31 points in 3 years at Duke. The Bayhawks drafted 9 total men from the draft.

Round	Pick	Name	Position	College
1	5	C.J. Costabile	Midfielder	Duke
2	10	Tyler Fiorito	Goalie	Princeton
3	22	Jimmy Dunster	Midfielder	North Carolina
4	26	Matt Mackrides	Attack	Penn State
4	27	Grant Kaleikau	Attack	Delaware
5	38	Matt Gibson	Attack	Yale
6	45	Drew Snider	Midfield	Maryland
7	53	Brent Adams	Midfield	Fairfield
8	61	John Austin	Midfield	Delaware

== Regular season ==
=== Schedule ===
Win	Loss

Date	Opponent	Stadium	Result	Attendance	Record
April 28	@ Long Island	James M. Shuart Stadium	13–11	1,100	1-0
May 5	Ohio	Navy–Marine Corps Memorial Stadium	23–11	10,162	2-0
May 12	Rochester	Navy–Marine Corps Memorial Stadium	12-8	7,853	2-1
May 18	@ Hamilton	Ron Joyce Stadium	20-7	3,751	3-1
June 2	@ Denver	Sports Authority Field at Mile High	18-16	3,125	4-1
June 9	Charlotte	Navy–Marine Corps Memorial Stadium	7-15	8,192	5-1
June 16	Hamilton	Navy–Marine Corps Memorial Stadium	15-16	9,832	6-1
June 23	Boston	Navy–Marine Corps Memorial Stadium	13-14	10,126	7-1
July 7	@ Charlotte	American Legion Memorial Stadium	12-13	5,013	7-2
July 14	@ Rochester	Sahlen's Stadium	13-7	3,221	8-2
July 21	@ Ohio	Selby Field	11-7	2,168	9-2
July 28	@ Boston	Harvard Stadium	13-16	9,117	9-3
August 4	Long Island	Navy–Marine Corps Memorial Stadium	6-13	10,083	10-3
August 11	Denver	Navy–Marine Corps Memorial Stadium	15-13	10,420	10-4
