= 2014 MLL All-Star Game =

2014 MLL All-Star
- Event: 2014 Major League Lacrosse season
Team USA	MLL All-Stars
(United States)	(United States)
10	9
- Date: June 26, 2014
- Venue: Harvard Stadium, Boston, Massachusetts
- Most Valuable Player: Rob Pannell (Team USA)
- Referee: John Hill
- Attendance: 10,327
- Weather: 63.0°F (17.2°C); Mostly Cloudy

The 2014 Major League Lacrosse All-Star Game took place on June 13, 2015 at Harvard Stadium, the home of NCAA university Harvard Crimson and MLL club Boston Cannons. The game was televised live on CBS Sports Network in the United States.

== The match ==
Team USA beat Team MLL, 10-9.
