= New Jersey Pride =

Defunct men's semi-professional field lacrosse team

- Founded: 2001
- Folded: 2008
- League: MLL
- Conference: Eastern
- Based in: Piscataway, New Jersey
- Colors: Red, Black, Gold, White
- Division titles: 0

The New Jersey Pride were a men's professional field lacrosse team in the Major League Lacrosse formerly based in Piscataway, New Jersey, United States from 2001-2008.

== Franchise history ==
In 2001, the first year of the league’s existence, the Pride played its games at Yogi Berra Stadium at Montclair State University. They moved to TD Bank Park in Bridgewater Township, New Jersey for the 2002 and 2003 seasons. From 2004 to 2005, the Pride played its home games on Sprague Field at Montclair State University. The Pride made the league's playoffs in 2002 and 2003.

For the 2006 season, the Pride moved to the 5,000 seat stadium on the campus of Rutgers University which houses the Scarlet Knights’ soccer and lacrosse teams and is officially named The Soccer/Lacrosse Stadium at Yurcak Field in honor of Ronald N. Yurcak, a 1965 All-American Rutgers lacrosse player.

In the 2008 Major League Lacrosse Collegiate Draft, the Pride drafted Matt Danowski from Duke with the second overall pick, Mike Leveille from Syracuse with the third overall pick and Jordan Levine from Albany with the tenth overall pick. Nick Mirabito from Navy was drafted in the fifth round with the 43rd overall pick by the Pride.

The team suspended operations after the 2008 season.

== Season-by-season ==
New Jersey Pride
Year	W	L	Regular season finish	Playoffs
2001	8	6	3rd in National Division	Did not reach the playoffs
2002	7	7	2nd in National Division	Lost semifinal 19-11 to Lizards
2003	7	5	2nd in National Division	Lost semifinal 15-13 to Bayhawks
2004	1	11	3rd in National Division	Did not reach the playoffs
2005	2	10	3rd in National Division	Did not reach the playoffs
2006	5	7	3rd in Eastern Conference	Did not reach the playoffs
2007	4	8	6th in Eastern Conference	Did not reach the playoffs
2008	6	6	4th in Eastern Conference	Did not reach the playoffs
Totals	40	60	Regular Season Win % = .400	Total Playoff Record 0 - 2 Playoff Win % = .000

=== Former Stars ===
- Jesse Hubbard. Princeton, 1998; 3-time NCAA National Champion, Princeton University with Jon Hess; Leading all-time scorer at Princeton; All NCAA Tournament Team, 1997 and 1998; All Ivy, 1997 and 1998. Hubbard was traded to the Los Angeles Riptide prior to the 2008 Season.
- Scott Urick. Georgetown, 2000; 2-time NCAA All-American and Captain; Georgetown’s all-time Leading Scorer; Georgetown’s All-Time Single Season and Career Leader in ground balls; Played on four NCAA Tournament Teams; NCAA North-South All-Star, 2000.
- Adam Doneger. Johns Hopkins, 2000-2003; two-time First Team All-American and co-captain; Scored a career-high 28 goals and seven assists in 2003; NCAA All-Tournament Team, 2002.
- Kyle Harrison. Johns Hopkins, 2005; National Player-of-the-Year, 2005 Tewaaraton Trophy Winner; 2005 National Champion and 1st overall selection in the 2005 College Draft. Harrison was also traded to the Los Angeles Riptide for the 2008 season.
- Matt Danowski. Duke, 2008; Tewaaraton Trophy Winner 2007; Acquired Second in the lacrosse draft. Took option of an extra year at Duke. Was expected to go first 2007

=== Award winners ===
- 4-time All-Star Jesse Hubbard
- 2-time All-Star Scott Urick
- 3-time All-Star Jay Jalbert
- 3-time All-Star David Curry
- 1-time All-Star Jon Hess
- 2003 Rookie of the Year and All-Star Adam Doneger
- 2005 Community Service Award Winner Ryan McClay
- 2006 All-MLL Team Andy Corno

== Coaches and others ==
- Ted Georgalas 2001-05 (24-35)
- Brian Silcott 2005 (1-4)
- Peter Jacobs 2006- (15-21)
- Charlie Shoulberg 2001-2002 (General Manager)
- Bob Turco 2003-2004 (General Manager)
- Trey Reeder 2005-2007 (General Manager)
- Steve Ferretti 2002-2008 (Assistant General Manager, General Manager)
- Robert Brown 2005-2008 (President)
