= 2004 Major League Lacrosse season =

2004 MLL season
- League: Major League Lacrosse
- Sport: Field lacrosse
- Duration: May 2004 – August 2004
- Teams: 6

MLL seasons
- ← 2003 season 2005 season →

The 2004 Major League Lacrosse season was the fourth season of the league. The season began on May 22 and concluded with the championship game on August 22, 2004.

== General information ==
The Bridgeport Barrage relocated to Philadelphia and became the Philadelphia Barrage before the season started. They played their home games at Villanova Stadium.

The Baltimore Bayhawks moved their home games to Johnny Unitas Stadium. The Boston Cannons moved theirs to Nickerson Field. The New Jersey Pride moved theirs to Sprague Field.

Major League Lacrosse played the first-ever regular season games in the western United States as Baltimore defeated Rochester by a 24–18 margin in Seahawks Stadium in Seattle on May 22. Baltimore defeated New Jersey 22–19 on June 5 at INVESCO Field in Denver.

== Regular season ==
W = Wins, L = Losses, PCT= Winning Percentage, PF= Points For, PA = Points Against

Qualified for playoffs

American Division
Team	W	L	PCT	PF	PA
Boston Cannons	8	4	.667	196	210
Philadelphia Barrage	7	5	.583	181	172
Long Island Lizards	6	6	.500	191	201

National Division
Team	W	L	PCT	PF	PA
Rochester Rattlers	7	5	.583	196	166
Baltimore Bayhawks	7	5	.583	203	172
New Jersey Pride	1	11	.083	182	228

Rochester defeated Baltimore 2 of 3 regular season games.

== All Star Game ==
There was no game played

== Playoffs ==
Semifinal games August 20, 2004

- Philadelphia 18-17 Rochester @ Nickerson Field, Boston, Massachusetts
- Boston 24-16 Baltimore @ Nickerson Field, Boston, Massachusetts

MLL Championship August 22, 2004

- Philadelphia 13-11 Boston @ Nickerson Field, Boston, Massachusetts

== Bracket ==
Semifinal
A1	Philadelphia	18
N2	Rochester	17
A2	Boston	24
N1	Baltimore	16

Steinfeld Cup Final
A1	Philadelphia	13
A2	Boston	11

== Awards ==
Award	Winner	Team
MVP Award	Conor Gill	Boston
Rookie of the Year Award	Ryan Boyle	Philadelphia
Coach of the Year Award	Sal LoCascio	Philadelphia
Defensive player of the Year Award	Nicky Polanco	Philadelphia
Offensive player of the Year Award	Blake Miller	Philadelphia
Goaltender of the Year Award	Greg Cattrano	Philadelphia
Sportsman of the Year Award	Kevin Finneran	Long Island

=== Weekly Awards ===
The MLL gave out awards weekly for the best offensive player, best defensive player and best rookie. No Rookie of the Week award was given Weeks 1 and 2; rookies did not play until after the Collegiate Draft on June 3.

Week	Offensive	Defensive	Rookie
1	Ryan Powell	Peter Inge	
2	Tim Goettelmann	Jake Coon	
3	Jesse Hubbard	Brian Dougherty	Chris Passavia
4	Ryan Powell	Greg Cattrano	Tillman Johnson
5	Gary Gait	Tillman Johnson; Brian Dougherty	Ryan Boyle
6	Keith Cromwell	Peter Inge	Ryan Boyle
7	Michael Watson	Brian Dougherty	Walid Hajj
8	Michael Watson	Kevin O'Brien	Ryan Boyle
9	Blake Miller	John Glatzel	Ryan Boyle
10	Michael Watson	Nicky Palanco	Tillman Johnson
11	Tom Marechek	Greg Cattrano	Kevin Boland
12	Blake Miller	Paul Cantabene	Ryan Boyle
