= Brian Phipps =

American lacrosse player

Personal information
- Nationality: United States
- Born: November 26, 1987 (age 38) Annapolis, Maryland, U.S.
- Height: 5 ft 9 in (175 cm)
- Weight: 185 lb (84 kg; 13 st 3 lb)

Sport
- Position: Goalkeeper
- MLL teams: Ohio Machine; Chesapeake Bayhawks
- PLL team Former teams: Whipsnakes LC; Redwoods LC
- NCAA team: University of Maryland

Brian Phipps (born November 26, 1987) is a professional lacrosse player for Whipsnakes Lacrosse Club of the Premier Lacrosse League, having previously played for Redwoods. He attended the University of Maryland where he was a USILA All-American, the ACC Freshman of the Year in 2007, and the University of Maryland Male Athlete of the Year as the Terrapins' goalkeeper. He was taken in the 9th round of the MLL Expansion Draft in 2011 by the Chesapeake Bayhawks.

Phipps worked as an assistant coach for the Georgetown Hoyas men's lacrosse team. After two seasons, he was hired as the head coach at Archbishop Spalding High School in 2014. Phipps led the team for nine seasons before resigning in 2023.
