= Ryan McClay =

American lacrosse player

Ryan McClay (born August 6, 1981) is an American lacrosse player. He plays defense for the New Jersey Pride in Major League Lacrosse since he was drafted by the team in the first round in the 2003 college draft. He played his college lacrosse at Cornell and his high school lacrosse at Mahopac High School in Mahopac, New York.

McClay played on the US Men's National Lacrosse Team at the 2010 World Lacrosse Championships in Manchester, England. The US team defeated Canada 12–10 in the final to reclaim the World Championship. McClay was selected to the All-World team after the championships.

McClay currently works as an assistant Varsity lacrosse coach at Fairfield College Preparatory School in Fairfield, Connecticut.
