= 2001 Major League Lacrosse season =

2001 MLL season
- League: Major League Lacrosse
- Sport: Field lacrosse
- Duration: May 2001 – August 2001
- Teams: 6
- TV partner: Fox Sports Net

MLL seasons
- 2002 season →

The 2001 Major League Lacrosse season was the inaugural season of the new semi-professional men's field lacrosse league. The league began play with six founding teams: Baltimore Bayhawks, Boston Cannons, Bridgeport Barrage, Long Island Lizards, New Jersey Pride and Rochester Rattlers. Each team played a 14-game regular season schedule that ended with a championship game on September 3, 2001.

Major League Lacrosse (MLL) played its first game on June 7 when Baltimore defeated Long Island 16–13 score at Homewood Field in Baltimore. Baltimore's Chris Turner scored the first goal in MLL regular season history. Those same two teams met in the Steinfeld Cup, the championship trophy named for co-founder Jake Steinfeld, with the Lizards turning the tables and beating the Bayhawks 15–11.

== Regular season ==
Qualified for playoffs

American Division
| Team | W | L | PCT | PF | PA |
| Long Island Lizards | 10 | 4 | .714 | 216 | 196 |
| Boston Cannons | 3 | 11 | .214 | 183 | 221 |
| Bridgeport Barrage | 3 | 11 | .214 | 190 | 216 |

National Division
| Team | W | L | PCT | PF | PA |
| Baltimore Bayhawks | 10 | 4 | .714 | 195 | 172 |
| Rochester Rattlers | 8 | 6 | .571 | 185 | 159 |
| New Jersey Pride | 8 | 6 | .571 | 197 | 199 |

Boston beat Bridgeport in 3 of 4 regular season games, Rochester beat New Jersey in 3 of 4 regular season games.

== All Star Game ==
The inaugural Major League Lacrosse All-Star Game was hosted by the Bridgeport Barrage at The Ballpark at Harbor Yard in Bridgeport, Connecticut on August 2, 2001. The National division team beat the American division 24–18. Mark Millon was the game's MVP.

== Playoffs ==
The top two teams from each division qualified for the playoffs. The 1st place team from one division would play the 2nd place team from the other division in the semifinals. All games were played at John F. Kennedy Stadium in Bridgeport, Connecticut.

The format resulted in Boston (3–11) making the playoffs while New Jersey (8–6) did not. The format was changed the following season, so the two division winners and the next two best teams regardless of division made the playoffs.

Semifinals; September 1
Long Island (10–4) | 13
Rochester (8–6) | 12
Baltimore (10–4) | 12
Boston (3–11) | 11

Steinfeld Cup Final; September 3
Long Island | 15
Baltimore | 11

== Awards ==
| Award | Winner | Team |
|---|---|---|
| MVP Award | Ryan Powell | Rochester |
| Rookie of the Year Award | Keith Cromwell | Bridgeport |
| Coach of the Year Award | John DeTommaso | Long Island |
| Defensive player of the Year Award | Rob Doerr | Baltimore |
| Offensive player of the Year Award | John Grant, Jr. | Rochester |
| Goaltender of the Year Award | Greg Cattrano | Baltimore |
| Iron Lizard Award | Joe Ghedina | Long Island |

Weekly Awards

| Week | Offensive | Defensive |
|---|---|---|
| 1 | Jesse Hubbard | Rob Doerr |
| 2 | Casey Powell | Jim Mule |
| 3 | Ryan Powell | Brian Dougherty |
| 4 | D'Arcy Sweet; Terry Riordan | Steve Koudelka |
| 5 | D'Arcy Sweet | Greg Cattrano |
| 6 | Mark Millon | Greg Cattrano |
| 7 | Jay Jalbert | John Gagliardi |
| 8 | John Grant, Jr. | Brian Dougherty |
| 9 | David Curry | Bill Daye |
| 10 | John Grant, Jr. | Regy Thorpe |
| 11 | John Grant, Jr. | Rob Doerr |
| 12 | Greg Traynor | Sal LoCascio |
| 13 | Paul Gait | Pat McCabe |

== Statistics leaders ==
| Stat | Player | Team | Number |
|---|---|---|---|
| Goals | Jesse Hubbard | New Jersey | 44 |
| Two-Point Goals | David Evans | Boston | 6 |
| Assists | Jon Hess | New Jersey | 39 |
| Points | Ryan Powell | Rochester | 63 |
| Face-off Pct | Andy Towers | Boston | .580 |
| Save Pct | Greg Cattrano | Baltimore | .583 |
| GAA | Brian Dougherty | Rochester | 11.7 |
