= 2003 Major League Lacrosse season =

2003 MLL season
- League: Major League Lacrosse
- Sport: Field lacrosse
- Duration: May 2003 – August 2003
- Teams: 6
- TV partner: ESPN2

MLL seasons
- ← 2002 season 2004 season →

The 2003 Major League Lacrosse season was the third season of the league. The season began on May 31 and concluded with the championship game on August 24, 2003.

== General information ==
Schedule was reduced from 14 to 12 games.

Baltimore moved their games to Homewood Field. Long Island moved theirs to Mitchel Athletic Complex and Rochester moved theirs to Bishop Kearney Field.

August 17: The first-ever cancellation of an MLL game occurred when rains forced the Baltimore Bayhawks and Long Island Lizards to cancel their game at Mitchel Field.

The league signed a national television agreement with ESPN2.

== Regular season ==
W = Wins, L = Losses, PCT= Winning Percentage, PF= Points For, PA = Points Against

Qualified for playoffs

American Division
| Team | W | L | PCT | PF | PA |
| Long Island Lizards* | 8 | 3 | .727 | 142 | 127 |
| Boston Cannons | 7 | 5 | .583 | 187 | 170 |
| Bridgeport Barrage | 1 | 11 | .083 | 188 | 254 |

National Division
| Team | W | L | PCT | PF | PA |
| Baltimore Bayhawks* | 7 | 4 | .636 | 149 | 138 |
| New Jersey Pride | 7 | 5 | .583 | 184 | 162 |
| Rochester Rattlers | 5 | 7 | .417 | 202 | 201 |

*The August 17 game between Baltimore at Long Island was canceled due to weather.

== All Star Game ==
July 17, 2003

- National 27-12 American at Mitchel Athletic Complex, Uniondale, New York, Gary Gait MVP

== Playoffs ==
Semifinals August 22, 2003

- Baltimore 15-13 New Jersey @ Villanova Stadium, Villanova, Pennsylvania
- Long Island 20-14 Boston @ Villanova Stadium, Villanova, Pennsylvania

MLL Championship August 24, 2003

- Long Island 15-14 (OT) Baltimore @ Villanova Stadium, Villanova, Pennsylvania

Kevin Lowe was named most valuable player of the championship game after scoring the winning goal in sudden death overtime.

== Bracket ==
Semifinal
N1 | Baltimore | 15
N2 | New Jersey | 13
A1 | Long Island | 20
A2 | Boston | 14

Steinfeld Cup Final
N1 | Baltimore | 14
A1 | Long Island | 15*

*overtime

== Awards ==
=== Annual ===
| Award | Winner | Team |
|---|---|---|
| MVP Award | Jay Jalbert | Long Island |
| Rookie of the Year Award | Adam Doneger | Rochester |
| Coach of the Year Award | Ted Georgalas | New Jersey |
| Defensive player of the Year Award | Ryan Curtis | Boston |
| Offensive player of the Year Award | Mark Millon | Baltimore |
| Goaltender of the Year Award | Brian Dougherty | Long Island |
| Iron Lizard of the Year Award | Jon Hess | New Jersey |

=== Weekly Awards ===
The MLL gave out awards weekly for the best offensive player, best defensive player and best rookie.

| Week | Offensive | Defensive | Rookie |
|---|---|---|---|
| 1 | Mark Millon | Brian Dougherty | Michael Peyser |
| 2 | Gary Gait | Trevor Tierney | Mike Springer |
| 3 | Casey Powell | Jake Coon | Adam Doneger |
| 4 | Mark Millon | Jamie Hanford | Ryan McClay |
| 5 | Conor Gill; Jesse Hubbard | Peter Inge | Kevin Cassese |
| 6 | David Evans; A.J. Haugen | Chris Garrity | Matt Hunter |
| 7 | Mike Regan; Keith Cromwell | Nicky Polanco | A.J. Shannon |
| 8 | Josh Coffman | Jamie Hanford | Kevin Cassese |
| 9 | Ryan Powell | Brian Carcaterra | Chris Garrity; Adam Doneger |
| 10 | Tim Goettelmann | Greg Cattrano | Chris Garrity |
| 11 | Casey Powell | Ryan McClay | Austin Garrison |
