= 2012 Major League Lacrosse season =

2012 MLL season
- League: Major League Lacrosse
- Sport: Field lacrosse
- Duration: April 28, 2012 – August 26, 2012
- Number of teams: 8
- Season MVP: Brendan Mundorf
- Top scorer: Paul Rabil
- Regular Season champions: Denver Outlaws

Steinfeld Cup
- Champions: Chesapeake Bayhawks
- Runners-up: Denver Outlaws
- Finals MVP: Ben Rubeor (CHE)

MLL seasons
- ← 2011 season 2013 season →

The 2012 Major League Lacrosse season is the 12th season of the league. The season began on April 28, 2012 and concluded with the Chesapeake Bayhawks winning the championship game on August 26, 2012 over the Denver Outlaws 16-6.

== Milestones & events ==
=== Team movement ===
On January 21, 2011, Commissioner David Gross announced that Charlotte, North Carolina and Columbus, Ohio, had been approved as expansion teams for the 2012 season. Gross also announced that, with the adding of two more teams, (to bring the total to eight) the league would return to a fourteen-game season in 2012.

== Standings ==
W = Wins, L = Losses, PCT = Winning Percentage, GB = Games Back of first place, GF = Goals For, 2ptGF = 2 point Goals For, GA = Goals Against, 2ptGA = 2 point Goals Against

Final

Playoff Seed

Team	W	L	PCT	GB	GF	2ptGF	GA	2ptGA
Denver Outlaws	11	3	.786	...	216	13	157	11
Chesapeake Bayhawks	10	4	.714	1	174	28	142	14
Boston Cannons	9	5	.643	2	207	10	159	13
Long Island Lizards	8	6	.571	3	165	13	166	8
Rochester Rattlers	7	7	.500	4	157	13	171	13
Charlotte Hounds	5	9	.357	6	146	14	200	14
Hamilton Nationals	4	10	.286	7	167	5	193	17
Ohio Machine	2	12	.143	9	160	15	204	21

== All Star Game ==
June 30, 2012 Old School 18-17 (SO)Young Guns at FAU Stadium. MVP Stephen Berger

== Playoffs ==
The Warrior Championship Weekend took place on Saturday August 25 & Sunday August 26 at Harvard Stadium, Boston MA. Ben Rubefor (Chesapeake) named Bud Light Championship weekend MVP.

Semifinals
Denver Outlaws	13
Long Island Lizards	12
Chesapeake Bayhawks	16
Boston Cannons	10

Steinfeld Cup Final
Denver Outlaws	6
Chesapeake Bayhawks	16

== Annual awards ==
Award	Winner	Team
MVP Award	Brendan Mundorf	Denver
Rookie of the Year Award	Matt Gibson	Long Island
Coach of the Year Award	Joe Spallina	Long Island
Defensive player of the Year Award	Lee Zink	Denver
Offensive player of the Year Award	Paul Rabil	Boston
Goaltender of the Year Award	Drew Adams	Long Island
Most Improved Player of the Year Award	Jeremy Sieverts	Denver
