= 2005 Major League Lacrosse season =

2005 MLL season
- League: Major League Lacrosse
- Sport: Field lacrosse
- Duration: May 2005 – August 2005
- Teams: 6

MLL seasons
- ← 2004 season 2006 season →

The 2005 Major League Lacrosse season was the fifth season of the league. The season began on May 20 and concluded with the championship game on August 21, 2005. This was the last MLL season when they just had 6 teams, and the next season, they had the new Western Conference.

== General information ==
The 45-second shot clock was changed to a 60-second shot clock in 2005.

The league played several exhibition and regular season games on the West Coast in 2005 as part of plans to expand to the region. For the second consecutive year, Qwest Field in Seattle hosted a MLL game. Baltimore defeated New Jersey 21–12 on May 28 in front of 8,478 in attendance at Qwest Field. An exhibition game between two all-star teams, Old School (inaugural season players) and the Young Guns, was played on July 2 at Invesco Field in Denver. It drew a crowd of 12,674—the largest in league history.

== Regular season ==
W = Wins, L = Losses, PCT= Winning Percentage, PF= Points For, PA = Points Against

Qualified for playoffs

American Division
Team	W	L	PCT	PF	PA
Boston Cannons	10	2	.833	200	159
Long Island Lizards	4	8	.333	177	189
Philadelphia Barrage	4	8	.333	156	194

National Division
Team	W	L	PCT	PF	PA
Baltimore Bayhawks	10	2	.833	247	158
Rochester Rattlers	6	6	.500	184	197
New Jersey Pride	2	10	.167	148	215

Long Island defeated Philadelphia 2 of 3 games in the regular season.

== All Star Game ==
July 2, 2005

- Young Guns 21-20(OT) Old School at INVESCO Field at Mile High, Denver, Colorado, Michael Powell MVP

Old School team was made up of players who began playing in 2001. Young Guns was made up of players who began in 2002 or later.

== Playoffs ==

Semifinal games August 19, 2005

- Baltimore 20-13 Rochester @ Nickerson Field, Boston, Massachusetts
- Long Island 19-14 Boston @ Nickerson Field, Boston, Massachusetts

MLL championship August 21, 2005

- Baltimore 15-9 Long Island @ Nickerson Field, Boston, Massachusetts

== Bracket ==
Semifinal
N1	Baltimore	20
N2	Rochester	13
A2	Long Island	19
A1	Boston	14

Steinfeld Cup Final
N1	Baltimore	15
A2	Long Island	9

== Awards ==
Award	Winner	Team
MVP Award	Mark Millon; Gary Gait	Boston; Baltimore
Rookie of the Year Award	Brodie Merrill	Baltimore
Coach of the Year Award	Scott Hiller	Boston
Defensive player of the Year Award	Nicky Polanco	Long Island
Offensive player of the Year Award	Casey Powell	Rochester
Goaltender of the Year Award	Chris Garrity	Boston
Sportsman of the Year Award	Pat McCabe	Long Island
Most Improved Player of the Year Award	Andrew Combs	Rochester
Community Service Award	Ryan McClay	New Jersey
