= Ben Rubeor =

American lacrosse player and coach

Personal information
- Nationality: American
- Born: March 12, 1986 (age 40) Baltimore, Maryland, U.S.
- Height: 5 ft 11 in (180 cm)
- Weight: 178 lb (81 kg; 12 st 10 lb)

Sport
- Position: Attack
- Shoots: Left
- Coached by: Atlas Lacrosse Club (2020–2022)
- NLL draft: 46th overall, 2008; New York Titans
- MLL team Former teams: Chesapeake Bayhawks; Long Island Lizards
- NCAA team: University of Virginia
- Pro career: 2008–2017

Ben Rubeor (born March 12, 1986) is a former professional lacrosse player and coach. He was the head coach for Atlas Lacrosse Club of the Premier Lacrosse League from 2020-2022. Rubeor previously played for the Chesapeake Bayhawks & Long Island Lizards in Major League Lacrosse. He was one of the nation's top collegiate lacrosse players at the University of Virginia. Ben also currently serves as the men's varsity head lacrosse coach and assistant admissions director at Thayer Academy in Braintree, Massachusetts.

== High school and collegiate career ==
Ben Rubeor played high school lacrosse at Loyola Blakefield in Towson, Maryland, where he scored 43 goals and 23 assists as a junior and 48 goals and 27 assists as a senior. In his senior year, he was selected a high school All-American and won the C. Markland Kelly Award as Maryland's best lacrosse player. He was also a two-time Baltimore Sun All-Metro selection and a two-time all-state selection.

Rubeor then played attack at the University of Virginia, where he had a standout career from 2005 to 2008 despite battling injuries. In his first year, he was an immediate starter and became one of the nation's best freshmen, scoring 18 goals and 16 assists for 34 total points, which led all Atlantic Coast Conference freshmen and ranked him third on the Cavalier team in assists and points. Inside Lacrosse magazine ranked him the #4 freshman in the country. As a sophomore in 2006, Rubeor won Second Team All-American honors while scoring 34 goals and notching 24 assists for 58 total points. He played an integral part in the Cavaliers' perfect 17-0 record en route to winning the 2006 NCAA championship. Rubeor was also selected to the All-ACC team, the only sophomore picked, as well as the All-ACC Tournament team and the All-ACC Academic Men's Lacrosse team. In 2007, Rubeor scored 46 goals and 22 assists for 68 points, earning First Team All-America honors, All-ACC honors, All-ACC Tournament team honors, and selection as a Tewaaraton Trophy finalist. As a senior in 2008, Rubeor scored 38 goals and 14 assists for 52 points, again earning First Team All-American honors, All-ACC honors, and recognition as a Tewaaraton Trophy finalist. He was also named the ACC Lacrosse Scholar Athlete of the Year and picked as a USILA Scholar All-American.

Rubeor's 136 career goals ranks fifth all-time on Virginia's career goals list, and his 212 career points ranks sixth on the school's career points list.

== Professional career ==
In 2008, Rubeor was drafted by the Long Island Lizards of Major League Lacrosse. He scored 13 goals and four assists in his debut season. In 2009, he played for the Washington Bayhawks.

Ben also worked full-time as a financial analyst for Greenspring Associates in Owings Mills, MD.

== Coaching career ==
In December 2019, Ben was named head coach of the Atlas in the Premier Lacrosse League (“PLL”). Ben was named head coach of St. Mary's High School's (Annapolis, MD) varsity lacrosse coach in 2012. In 2015, he led the team to their first MIAA A conference championship in 19 years.

In 2018, the Boston Cannons announced the signing of Rubeor as the assistant coach and offensive coordinator for the MLL team.

In December 2019, the Premier Lacrosse League released that Rubeor would become head coach of Atlas Lacrosse Club entering the 2020 season. On October 21, 2023, he resigned his coaching and general manager duties citing a desire to devote more time with his family.

== Awards and honors ==
- USILA 1st Team All-American (2007, 2008)
- USILA 2nd Team All-American (2006)
- All-Atlantic Coast Conference (2006, 2007, 2008)
- All-ACC Tournament team (2006, 2007, 2008)
- All-ACC Academic team
- Finalist for Tewaaraton Trophy (2007, 2008)
- Finalist for Lowe's Senior CLASS Award (2008)
- Major League Lacrosse Championship Weekend MVP
- Major League Lacrosse Champion

== Statistics ==
=== NCAA ===
Season	GP	G	A	Pts	PPG
2005	15	18	16	34	2.27
2006	15	34	24	58	3.87
2007	16	46	22	68	4.25
2008	15	38	14	52	3.87
Totals	61	136	76	212	3.48

=== Major League Lacrosse ===
		Regular Season							Playoffs
Season	Team	GP	G	2ptG	A	Pts	GB	PIM	GP	G	2ptG	A	Pts	GB	PIM
2008	Long Island	10	13	0	4	17	18	3.5	--	--	--	--	--	--	--
2009	Washington	6	6	0	3	9	2	1	--	--	--	--	--	--	--
2010	Chesapeake	11	0	9	24	12	5.5	2	0	0	6	6	3	1
2011	Chesapeake	12	17	0	10	27	28	5	1	0	0	0	0	2	.5
2012	Chesapeake	13	16	1	4	21	14	6	2	8	0	0	8	2	0
2013	Chesapeake	14	30	0	11	41	23	3.5	2	2	0	2	4	2	0
2014	Chesapeake	14	16	0	5	21	18	6.5	--	--	--	--	--	--	--
2015	Chesapeake	--	--	--	--	--	--	--	--	--	--	--	--	--	--
MLL Totals		86	124	1	47	172	125	31.5	7	10	0	8	18	9	1.5
