= Steinfeld Trophy =

The Steinfeld Trophy was a trophy given annually to the winners of the Major League Lacrosse (MLL) championship. The trophy is contested in a 4-team playoff where the top teams (based on regular season record) compete in a single-elimination format. In 2002 and since 2014, the semifinals and the championship game are on separate weekends. The award is named after MLL co-founder Jake Steinfeld. Since the league's inception, the championship has been played at a pre-designated neutral location.

== Finals ==
Season	Date	Champion	Score	Runner-up	Venue	Location	Attendance	Game MVP
2001	September 3	Long Island Lizards	15–11	Baltimore Bayhawks	Kennedy Stadium	Bridgeport, CT	6,745	Paul Gait (Long Island)
2002	September 1	Baltimore Bayhawks	21–13	Long Island Lizards	Columbus Crew Stadium	Columbus, OH	5,596	Mark Millon (Baltimore)
2003	August 24	Long Island Lizards	15–14 (OT)	Baltimore Bayhawks	Villanova Stadium	Villanova, PA	6,593	Kevin Lowe (Long Island)
2004	August 22	Philadelphia Barrage	13–11	Boston Cannons	Nickerson Field	Boston, MA	8,279	Greg Cattrano (Philadelphia)
2005	August 21	Baltimore Bayhawks	15–9	Long Island Lizards	Nickerson Field	Boston, MA	6,829	Gary Gait (Baltimore)
2006	August 27	Philadelphia Barrage	23–12	Denver Outlaws	The Home Depot Center	Carson, CA	5,374	Roy Colsey (Philadelphia)
2007	August 26	Philadelphia Barrage	16–13	Los Angeles Riptide	PAETEC Park	Rochester, NY	5,288	Matt Striebel (Philadelphia)
2008	August 24	Rochester Rattlers	16–6	Denver Outlaws	Harvard Stadium	Boston, MA	8,481	Joe Walters (Rochester)
2009	August 23	Toronto Nationals	10–9	Denver Outlaws	Navy–Marine Corps Memorial Stadium	Annapolis, MD	7,003	Merrick Thomson (Toronto)
2010	August 22	Chesapeake Bayhawks	13–9	Long Island Lizards	Navy–Marine Corps Memorial Stadium	Annapolis, MD	6,445	Kyle Hartzell (Chesapeake)
2011	August 28	Boston Cannons	10–9	Hamilton Nationals	Navy–Marine Corps Memorial Stadium	Annapolis, MD	5,027	Jordan Burke (Boston)
2012	August 26	Chesapeake Bayhawks	16–6	Denver Outlaws	Harvard Stadium	Boston, MA	7,384	Ben Rubeor (Chesapeake)
2013	August 25	Chesapeake Bayhawks	10–9	Charlotte Hounds	PPL Park	Chester, PA	3,892	John Grant Jr. (Chesapeake)
2014	August 23	Denver Outlaws	12–11	Rochester Rattlers	Fifth Third Bank Stadium	Kennesaw, GA	8,149	John Grant Jr. (Denver)
2015	August 8	New York Lizards	15–12	Rochester Rattlers	Fifth Third Bank Stadium	Kennesaw, GA	8,674	Paul Rabil (New York)
2016	August 20	Denver Outlaws	19–18	Ohio Machine	Fifth Third Bank Stadium	Kennesaw, GA	5,522	Eric Law (Denver)
2017	August 19	Ohio Machine	17–12	Denver Outlaws	The Ford Center at The Star	Frisco, TX	7,543	Marcus Holman (Ohio)
2018	August 18	Denver Outlaws	16-12	Dallas Rattlers	MUSC Health Stadium	Charleston, SC	4,086	Matt Kavanagh (Denver)
2019	October 6	Chesapeake Bayhawks	10-9	Denver Outlaws	Dick's Sporting Goods Park	Denver, CO	6,374	Steele Stanwick (Chesapeake)
2020	July 26	Boston Cannons	13-10	Denver Outlaws	Navy-Marine Corps Memorial Stadium	Annapolis, MD	No fans due to COVID-19 pandemic	Not awarded

=== Championship game ===
#	Team	W	L	Pct
10	Denver Outlaws	3	7	.300
8	Chesapeake Bayhawks	6	2	.750
6	New York Lizards	3	3	.500
4	Dallas Rattlers	1	3	.250
3	Philadelphia Barrage	3	0	1.000
3	Boston Cannons	2	1	.667
2	Hamilton Nationals	1	1	.500
2	Ohio Machine	1	1	.500
1	Los Angeles Riptide	0	1	.000
1	Charlotte Hounds	0	1	.000

== MLL playoffs ==
Team	First season	Last appearance	Last final	Last championship
Boston	2001	2020	2020	2020
New York	2001	2018	2015	2015
New Jersey ^{[a]}	2001	2003	Never	Never
Philadelphia ^{[a]}	2001	2008	2007	2007
Dallas	2001	2018	2018	2008
Chesapeake	2001	2020	2019	2019
Chicago ^{[b]}	2006	Never	Never	Never
Connecticut	2020	2020	Never	Never
Denver	2006	2020	2020	2018
Los Angeles ^{[c]}	2006	2008	2007	Never
San Francisco ^{[c]}	2006	2006	Never	Never
Hamilton ^{[d]}	2009	2013	2011	2009
Charlotte	2012	2016	2013	Never
Ohio	2012	2017	2017	2017
Florida	2014	2017	Never	Never
Atlanta	2016	2019	Never	Never

^{[a]} played 2001 to 2008
^{[b]} played 2006 to 2010
^{[c]} played 2006 to 2008
^{[d]} played 2009 to 2013

=== All-time playoff records ===
Team	GP	W	L	Pct	Championships
Atlanta	1	0	1	.000	0
Boston	15	4	11	.267	2
Charlotte	3	1	2	.333	0
Chesapeake	19	14	5	.737	5
Chicago	0	–	–	–	0
Dallas	13	5	8	.384	1
Denver	23	12	11	.522	3
Florida	1	0	1	.000	0
Hamilton	5	3	2	.600	1
Los Angeles	3	1	2	.333	0
New Jersey	2	0	2	.000	0
New York	17	9	8	.529	3
Ohio	6	3	3	.500	1
Philadelphia	7	6	1	.857	3
San Francisco	1	0	1	.000	0
