= 2007 Major League Lacrosse season =

2007 MLL season
- League: Major League Lacrosse
- Sport: Field lacrosse
- Duration: May 2007 – August 2007
- Teams: 10

MLL seasons
- ← 2006 season 2008 season →

The 2007 Major League Lacrosse season was the seventh season of the league. The season began on May 12 and concluded with the championship game on August 26, 2007.

== General information ==
In November 2006, the Baltimore Bayhawks relocated to Washington, D.C. and became the Washington Bayhawks. They played 5 of their 6 games at Multi-Sport Field and 1 at George Mason Stadium.

New venues in 2007

- The Boston Cannons moved their home games to Harvard Stadium.
- The Chicago Machine moved their home games to Toyota Park.
- The Philadelphia Barrage moved their home games to United Sports Training Center

New rules in 2007:

- Moved the two-point arc back to 16 yards (15 m) away from the goal. It had previously been 15 yards (14 m) away.
- Created the same stick dimension requirements as NCAA.
- Enforce “pull-strings” as making a stick illegally altered and thus cannot re-enter the game.

Chicago won for the first time in franchise history on June 2 defeating Denver. The Machine had lost a league record 13 consecutive games (including all 12 games in 2006).

The 2007 season was a record breaking season:

- On June 16, the Rochester Rattlers won a 27–26 (in overtime) game over the Denver Outlaws in the highest scoring game in MLL history at INVESCO Field at Mile High the teams combined for a total 53 goals.
- A MLL record crowd of 19,793 watched the July 4 game between Chicago and Denver at INVESCO Field at Mile High. The previous mark was 15,981, set by a Los Angeles at Denver game in 2006.
- John Grant, Jr. broke the league's single-season points record with 71 points, while Spencer Ford set the single-season assists record 47.

== Regular season ==
W = Wins, L = Losses, PCT = Winning Percentage, GF = Goals For, 2ptGF = 2 point Goals For, GA = Goals Against, 2ptGA = 2 point Goals Against

Qualified for playoffs

Eastern Conference
Team	W	L	PCT	GF	2ptGF	GA	2ptGA
Philadelphia Barrage	9	3	.750	175	5	139	5
Rochester Rattlers	9	3	.750	208	5	153	10
Boston Cannons	5	7	.417	169	2	179	2
Long Island Lizards	5	7	.417	156	6	162	8
Washington Bayhawks	5	7	.417	134	11	190	5
New Jersey Pride	4	8	.333	155	5	163	6

Western Conference
Team	W	L	PCT	GF	2ptGF	GA	2ptGA
Los Angeles Riptide	9	3	.750	190	5	138	5
Denver Outlaws	7	5	.583	190	7	174	12
San Francisco Dragons	4	8	.333	157	12	180	6
Chicago Machine	3	9	.250	162	7	218	6

Philadelphia finished first in the East over Rochester based on a better conference record (8–2 vs. 7–3).

Boston finished 3rd in the East based on combine record against Long Island and Washington: 3–1 (2–0 against Washington, and 1–1 against Long Island). Long Island finished 4th based on combine record against Boston and Washington: 2–2 (1–1 against Washington 1–1 against Boston) and Washington finished 5th based on combine record against Boston and Long Island: 1–3 (1–1 against Long Island and 0–2 against Boston).

== All Star Game ==
July 8 at Harvard Stadium in Boston
Eastern Conference All Stars 19–12 Western Conference All Stars

MVP Matt Poskay (Boston) for the Eastern Conference

== Playoffs ==
The 2007 NB Zip Major League Lacrosse Championship Weekend took place August 25–26 at PAETEC Park in Rochester, New York

Semi-finals August 25 @PAETEC Park, Rochester, New York
Philadelphia 13–12(OT) Denver
Los Angeles 15–14 Rochester

Championship August 27@PAETEC Park, Rochester, New York
Philadelphia 16–13 Los Angeles

== Bracket ==
Semifinal
1	Philadelphia	13 (OT)
4	Denver	12
3	Los Angeles	15
2	Rochester	14

Steinfeld Cup Final
1	Philadelphia	16
3	Los Angeles	13

MVP: Matt Striebel (Philadelphia)

== Awards ==
Award	Winner	Team
MVP Award	John Grant, Jr.	Rochester
Rookie of the Year Award	Alex Smith	Rochester
Coach of the Year Award	John Tucker	Los Angeles
Defensive player of the Year Award	Brodie Merrill	Rochester
Offensive player of the Year Award	John Grant, Jr.	Rochester
Goaltender of the Year Award	Brian Dougherty	Philadelphia
Sportsman of the Year Award	Greg Bice	Los Angeles
Most Improved Player of the Year Award	Spencer Ford	Los Angeles
