= Chris Garrity =

American lacrosse player

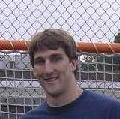

Personal information
- Nationality: American
- Born: June 18, 1981 (age 45) Annapolis, Maryland, U.S.
- Height: 6 ft 2 in (188 cm)
- Weight: 200 lb (91 kg; 14 st 4 lb)

Sport
- Position: Goalkeeper
- MLL team Former teams: Chesapeake Bayhawks; Boston Cannons
- NCAA team: Penn State University
- Pro career: 2003–2012

Chris Garrity (born June 18, 1981) is a former professional lacrosse goaltender with the Chesapeake Bayhawks of Major League Lacrosse (MLL). He retired from MLL on 19 January 2012. Coming out of high school, Chris' best sport was soccer where he excelled as a marking back. Despite being a better soccer player Chris decided to pursue lacrosse in college.

== Professional career ==
2007 (Washington): Played in all twelve regular season games for the Chesapeake Bayhawks. Was named to the US Lacrosse Men's team and competed in the US Lacrosse Champion's Challenge. Garrity was named MLL Goalkeeper of the week and named a 2007 All-Star.

2006 (Boston): Played in eleven games for the Boston Cannons. He recorded 200 saves and 151 GAs on the season. Won the 2006 Defensive Player of the Week award.

2005 (Boston): Led the MLL in wins (10), goals against average (12.5) and save percentage (.596) with the Boston Cannons. He earned the Cannons MVP award while helping them to win their second straight American Division title. He was honored with the Major League Lacrosse Goaltender of the Year Award,

2004 (Boston): Began the season as the Cannons starting goalie until a knee injury sidelined him late in June. Missed five games before returning for the last game of the year. Recorded a season high 24 saves against Rochester on June 5.

2003 (Boston): Named Boston's Rookie of the Year. Played in seven games while starting six and was a two-time MLL Rookie of the Week recipient.

== College career ==
After attending St. Mary's High School in Annapolis, Maryland, Garrity played college lacrosse at Penn State University. Named team captain and team MVP in his senior season. Was All-ECAC second team in 2003 while leading the Nittany Lions to their first NCAA Tournament appearance in school history. Ranks fifth in PSU history with 444 career saves. Was a two-time ECAC Defensive Player of the Week recipient in 2003.

== Awards ==
Preceded by Greg Cattrano	Major League Lacrosse Goaltender of the Year; 2005	Succeeded by Brian Dougherty

== See also ==
- Lacrosse in Pennsylvania
