= 2002 Major League Lacrosse season =

2002 MLL season
- League: Major League Lacrosse
- Sport: Field lacrosse
- Duration: June 2002 – September 2002
- Teams: 6
- TV partner: Fox Sports Net

MLL seasons
- ← 2001 season 2003 season →

The 2002 Major League Lacrosse season was the second season of the league. The season began on June 6 and concluded with the championship game on September 1, 2002.

== General information ==
Baltimore moved its home games to Ravens Stadium. New Jersey moved its home games to Commerce Bank Ballpark.

For the first time, a regular season game is played at a neutral site as the Rochester Rattlers defeated the New Jersey Pride at Hersheypark Stadium in Hershey, Pennsylvania on June 22.

== Regular season ==
W = Wins, L = Losses, PCT= Winning Percentage, PF= Points For, PA = Points Against

Qualified for playoffs

American Division
Team	W	L	PCT	PF	PA
Long Island Lizards	9	5	.643	234	196
Boston Cannons	7	7	.500	218	226
Bridgeport Barrage	3	11	.214	181	235

National Division
Team	W	L	PCT	PF	PA
Baltimore Bayhawks	10	4	.714	210	172
New Jersey Pride	7	7	.500	202	219
Rochester Rattlers	6	8	.429	173	180

== All Star Game ==
July 21, 2002

- National 21-16 American at Prince George's Stadium, Bowie, Maryland, Scott Urick MVP

== Playoffs ==
Semifinals August 24 & 25 2002

- Long Island 19-11 New Jersey @ Hofstra Stadium, Hempstead, New York
- Baltimore 15-10 Boston @ Ravens Stadium, Baltimore, Maryland

MLL championship game September 1, 2002

Baltimore 21-13 Long Island @ Columbus Crew Stadium, Columbus, Ohio

== Bracket ==
Semifinal
A1	Long Island	19
N2	New Jersey	11
N1	Baltimore	15
A2	Boston	10

Steinfeld Cup Final
A1	Long Island	13
N1	Baltimore	21

== Awards ==
Award	Winner	Team
MVP Award	Greg Cattrano	Baltimore
Rookie of the Year Award	Conor Gill	Boston
Coach of the Year Award	Scott Hiller	Boston
Defensive player of the Year Award	Christian Cook	New Jersey
Offensive player of the Year Award	Mark Millon	Baltimore
Goaltender of the Year Award	Greg Cattrano	Baltimore
Iron Lizard Award	Paul Cantabene	Baltimore

=== Weekly Awards ===
The MLL did not give out awards weekly for the best offensive player and best defensive player in 2002.
