= Ryan Powell (lacrosse) =

American lacrosse player (born 1978)

Personal information
- Nicknames: RP, Rhino
- Nationality: American
- Born: February 23, 1978 (age 48) West Carthage, New York, U.S.
- Height: 6 ft 1 in (185 cm)
- Weight: 205 lb (93 kg; 14 st 9 lb)
- Website: http://RhinoLacrosse.com

Sport
- Position: Attack
- Shoots: Right
- NLL draft: 2nd overall, 2000; Buffalo Bandits
- NLL team Former teams: Boston Blazers; Edmonton Rush; Colorado Mammoth; New York Titans; Portland Lumberjax; Anaheim Storm; Buffalo Bandits
- MLL team Former teams: Denver Outlaws; San Francisco Dragons; Rochester Rattlers
- NCAA team: Syracuse ('00)
- Pro career: 2001–

Ryan Powell (born February 23, 1978) is a four-time All-American lacrosse player at Syracuse University and was on the US national team roster in 2006 and 2010.

== Background ==
Powell did not begin playing organized lacrosse until he was in the seventh grade. He is the middle brother of three lacrosse-playing brothers, younger than Casey but older than Michael. He attended Carthage Senior High School where he was the quarterback for the football team and played on the lacrosse team. In 1996, Powell chose to attend Syracuse University, following his brother Casey.

At Syracuse, he was a four-time All-American (his brother Casey was also a four-time All-American). After his college career he was drafted third in the 2000 MLL draft. He currently plays for the Boston Blazers of the National Lacrosse League (indoor lacrosse) and the Denver Outlaws of Major League Lacrosse (outdoor). Powell owns and operates both Rhino Lacrosse and Powell Lacrosse. He was sponsored by Warrior Lacrosse with his brother Casey up until 2004–2005. After leaving Warrior, Ryan is now a prominent figure and representative for Brine Lacrosse. Still living in Oregon, Powell's entire income comes solely from lacrosse.

== Professional career ==
=== MLL ===
Powell has played in Major League Lacrosse since 2001. He played for the Rochester Rattlers from 2001 to 2005, and the San Francisco Dragons in 2006 and 2007. In 2001 Powell earned MVP for the 2001 MLL season. In 2006, Powell was awarded both the Major League Lacrosse Offensive Player of the Year Award and the MVP. He is the second lacrosse player to receive the MVP award twice, (John Grant Jr. did as well (NLL: '07, '12 MLL: '07, '08)). Prior to the 2008 MLL season, the San Francisco Dragons traded Powell to the Denver Outlaws in exchange for draft picks. He, Casey, and Mike all sat out for the 2009 MLL season, as they did not report to their respective teams by the contract deadline. This was Powell's first season sitting out, while it was Casey's second, and Mike's third.

=== NLL ===
Powell also plays indoor lacrosse in the National Lacrosse League with the Boston Blazers.

=== Team USA ===
Powell competed in the World Lacrosse Championships in 2006, and 2010. In 2006 the USA fell to Canada. He was the captain of 2010 team, which won the gold medal.

== Coaching career ==
In 2004, he helped take Syracuse University to another National Championship while being an assistant coach.

In 2005, Powell founded Rhino lacrosse in Portland, Oregon.

In 2021, Powell was named the head coach for Christian Brothers Academy in Syracuse.

== Accolades and awards ==
=== High school accolades ===
- All American
- 2x Empire State team member
- 5th All-time leading scorer in New York State High school history
- 244 Goals, 185 Assists, 429 Points

=== College accolades ===
- Tied for 2nd all-time for scoring in Syracuse Lacrosse History (287 points)
- Winner of the Lt. Raymond J. Enners Award as the Division I National Player of the Year
- Winner of the Lt. Col. Jack Turnbull Award as the Division I National Attackman of the Year in 2000.

=== Professional accolades ===
- 2001 MLL MVP
- 2006 MLL MVP
- 2006 MLL Offensive Player of the Year
- 2008 MLL All Star Game MVP
- Rochester Rattlers All Time Leading Scorer
- 6 x MLL All Star

He was the first player in MLL history to earn both the Offensive Player of the Year and Bud Light MVP awards in the same season.

In 2018, Powell was inducted into the National Lacrosse Hall of Fame.

== Statistics ==
=== NLL ===
		Regular Season						Playoffs
Season	Team	GP	G	A	Pts	LB	PIM	GP	G	A	Pts	LB	PIM
2001	Buffalo	13	17	18	35	56	14	--	--	--	--	--	--
2002	Buffalo	11	13	13	26	52	5	--	--	--	--	--	--
2004	Buffalo	1	0	1	1	5	2	--	--	--	--	--	--
2005	Anaheim	16	15	31	46	76	8	--	--	--	--	--	--
2006	Portland	13	12	26	38	46	8	1	1	1	2	2	0
2007	Portland	14	23	31	54	65	6	--	--	--	--	--	--
2008	Portland	16	21	43	64	75	2	3	10	10	20	10	0
2009	Portland	16	18	44	62	67	8	1	2	3	5	2	0
2010	Edmonton	15	21	30	51	24	4	2	1	7	8	3	0
NLL totals		115	140	237	377	466	57	7	14	21	35	17	0

=== MLL ===
		Regular Season							Playoffs
Season	Team	GP	G	2ptG	A	Pts	LB	PIM	GP	G	2ptG	A	Pts	LB	PIM
2001	Rochester	14	32	0	31	63	0	3	1	4	0	0	4	0	0
2002	Rochester	12	24	0	21	45	0	3	-	-	-	-	-	-	-
2003	Rochester	6	13	0	18	31	0	3	-	-	-	-	-	-	-
2004	Rochester	10	30	0	25	55	2	4	1	4	0	0	4	0	0
2005	Rochester	8	21	0	15	36	1	6	1	2	0	4	6	0	0
2006	San Francisco	10	34	0	24	58	2	1	1	1	0	2	3	0	1
2007	San Francisco	10	18	1	22	41	0	2	-	-	-	-	-	-	-
2008	Denver	10	15	0	23	38	9	1	2	4	0	3	7	1	0
MLL Totals		80	187	1	179	367	14	23	6	15	0	9	24	1	1

=== NCAA ===
		Regular Season
Season	Team	GP	G	A	Pts
1997	Syracuse	14	16	17	33
1998	Syracuse	14	37	36	73
1999	Syracuse	17	39	46	85
2000	Syracuse	16	45	51	96
NCAA Totals		61	137	150 ^{(a)}	287 ^{(b)}

^{(a)} 17th in NCAA Division I career assists
^{(b)} 10th in NCAA Division I career points

== Other ==
He is the first fully endorsed Nike lacrosse athlete.

== See also ==
- Casey Powell
- Mike Powell
- List of family relations in the National Lacrosse League
- Syracuse Orange men's lacrosse
