= Chesapeake Bayhawks =

Men's field lacrosse team based in Maryland, U.S.

- Sport: Lacrosse
- Founded: 2001
- Folded: 2020
- League: Major League Lacrosse
- Team history: Baltimore Bayhawks (2001–2006); Washington Bayhawks (2007–2009)
- Based in: Annapolis, Maryland
- Stadium: Navy–Marine Corps Memorial Stadium
- Colors: Navy, light green, silver, white
- Owner: Major League Lacrosse
- President: Mark Burdett
- Head coach: Tom Mariano
- General manager: Tom Mariano
- League titles: 6 (2002, 2005, 2010, 2012, 2013, 2019)
- Division titles: 2001, 2002, 2003, 2005

The Chesapeake Bayhawks were a Major League Lacrosse (MLL) professional men's field lacrosse team based in Annapolis, Maryland. They played in the greater Baltimore metro area beginning with the MLL's inaugural 2001 season, as the Baltimore Bayhawks from 2001 to 2006 and as the Washington Bayhawks from 2007 to 2009.

They won six Steinfeld Cup titles, the most of any MLL franchise.

== Franchise history ==
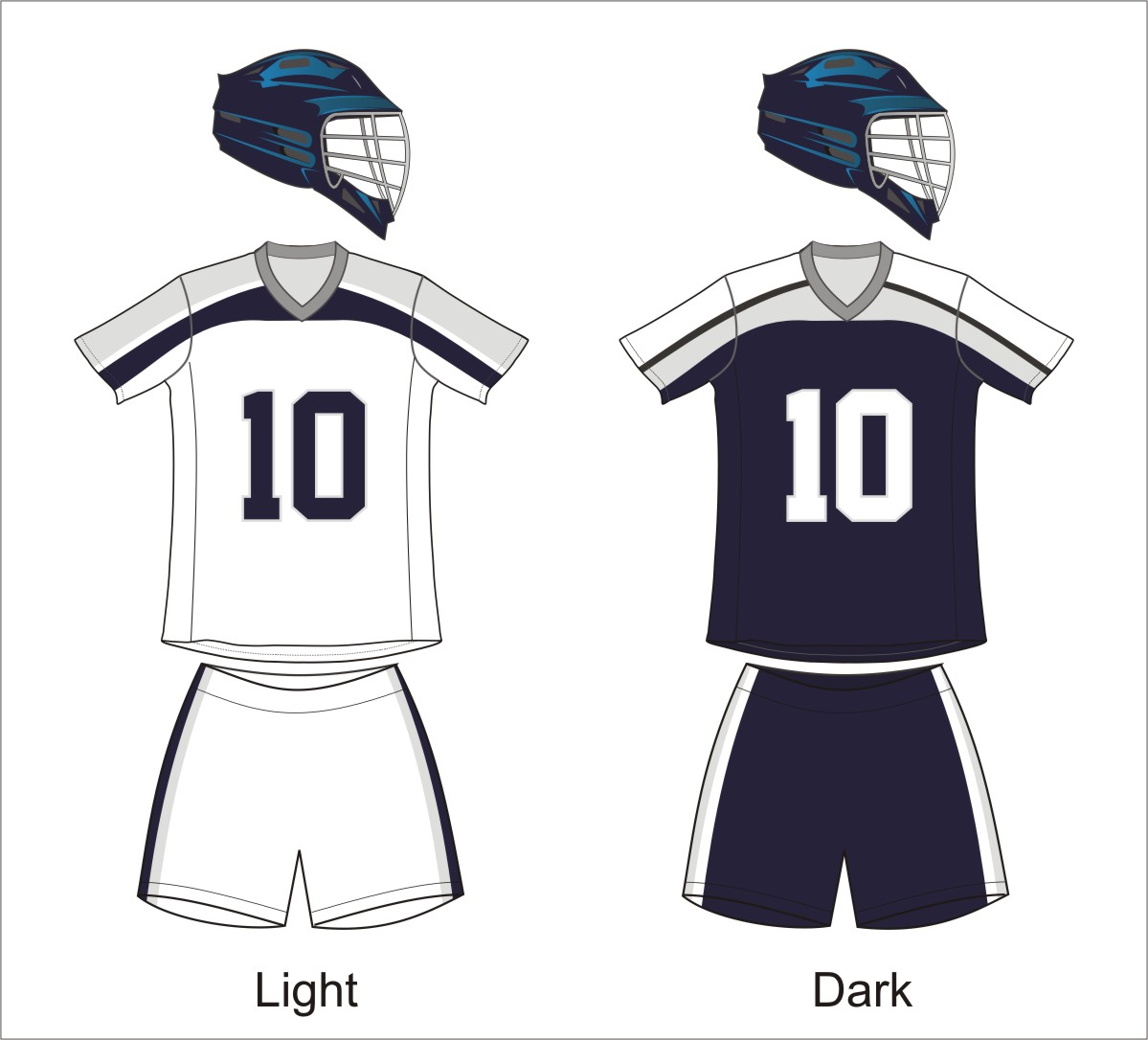
Bayhawks uniforms

=== Early success ===
The Bayhawks played two seasons at Homewood Field at Johns Hopkins University, in 2001 and 2003, while they played at M&T Bank Stadium in downtown Baltimore in 2002. Their home moved to Johnny Unitas Stadium on the campus of Towson University from 2004 to 2006. They won National Division titles in 2001, 2002, 2003, and 2005 and made the 2004 playoffs as a wild card.

In 2001, the Bayhawks won the National Division crown, but fell short in the championship game to the Long Island Lizards. The following year, the Bayhawks repeated as National Division champions and this time avenged their title game loss by beating the Lizards to win their first MLL crown. In the MLL's third season, the Bayhawks continued their National Division dominance with their third straight title, but again came up just short in the MLL Championship against the Lizards. The Bayhawks made the playoffs in 2004, but were eliminated in the semifinals.

The 2005 Bayhawks squad is regarded as one of the greatest lacrosse teams ever assembled. Led by hall-of-famers Gary Gait and Tom Marechek, the Bayhawks went 10–2, dominating the competition and setting several scoring records throughout the year. They scored 47 more goals than any other team and lead the league with fewest goals allowed, resulting in an average score of 20–13. The team capped the regular season with their fourth National Division title and their second MLL crown.

The Bayhawks were the only Major League Lacrosse team to have a winning season in each of the first five years of the league, posting a 44–19 record.

=== Move to Washington, D.C. ===
The 2006 season was a transition year for the Bayhawks. BT Lax Operating purchased the franchise from the prior ownership group led by the Pivec family. The Bayhawks went 4–8 and missed the playoffs for the first time in its history. Following the season, the new owners announced the team would be renamed the Washington Bayhawks and play around Washington, D.C..

The Washington Bayhawks played their first home game of the 2007 season at George Mason Stadium in Fairfax, Virginia with the subsequent five home games at Georgetown University's Multi-Sport Field. George Mason Stadium served as the primary field for five home games during 2008 with one home game at Navy–Marine Corps Memorial Stadium in Annapolis, Maryland. Both years the Bayhawks produced losing records, 5–7 and 4–8.

In 2009, the Bayhawks returned to Maryland for good and signed a three-year agreement with the US Naval Academy for their home games. A permanent home did not help the Bayhawks on the field, they finished with another 5–7 season.

=== Dynasty in Annapolis ===
In March 2010, the Bayhawks announced a new ownership group, Hometown Lacrosse, LLC led by majority owner Brendan Kelly. The Bayhawks also announced that the team name would be changed to the Chesapeake Bayhawks to include all areas of the region from Northern Maryland to Virginia and Washington, D.C. to the Eastern Shore. The Bayhawks continued to play at Navy–Marine Corps Memorial Stadium in Annapolis. The team started out 4–6, leading Kelly to fire John Tucker and take over as head coach himself. With Kelly's leadership, the team finished the 2010 season at 6–6 and made the playoffs for the first time since 2005. The Bayhawks defeated the Boston Cannons 13–9 in the semifinals, and won the Steinfeld Trophy for the third time with another 13–9 victory over their archrivals, the Long Island Lizards.

After a rollercoaster season and another 6–6 record in 2011, the Bayhawks were defeated by the Boston Cannons in a close match-up in the playoffs at home. In the off-season, the team made some major changes when Kelly stepped down as head coach and promoted Dave Cottle from assistant coach to head coach. Cottle immediately brought in Tony Resch to serve as his defensive coordinator. In 2012 they recaptured the Steinfeld Cup, defeating the Denver Outlaws 16–6 in the final.

The Bayhawks repeated as MLL champions in 2013, defeating the Charlotte Hounds 10–9 in the final.

=== Playoff drought ===
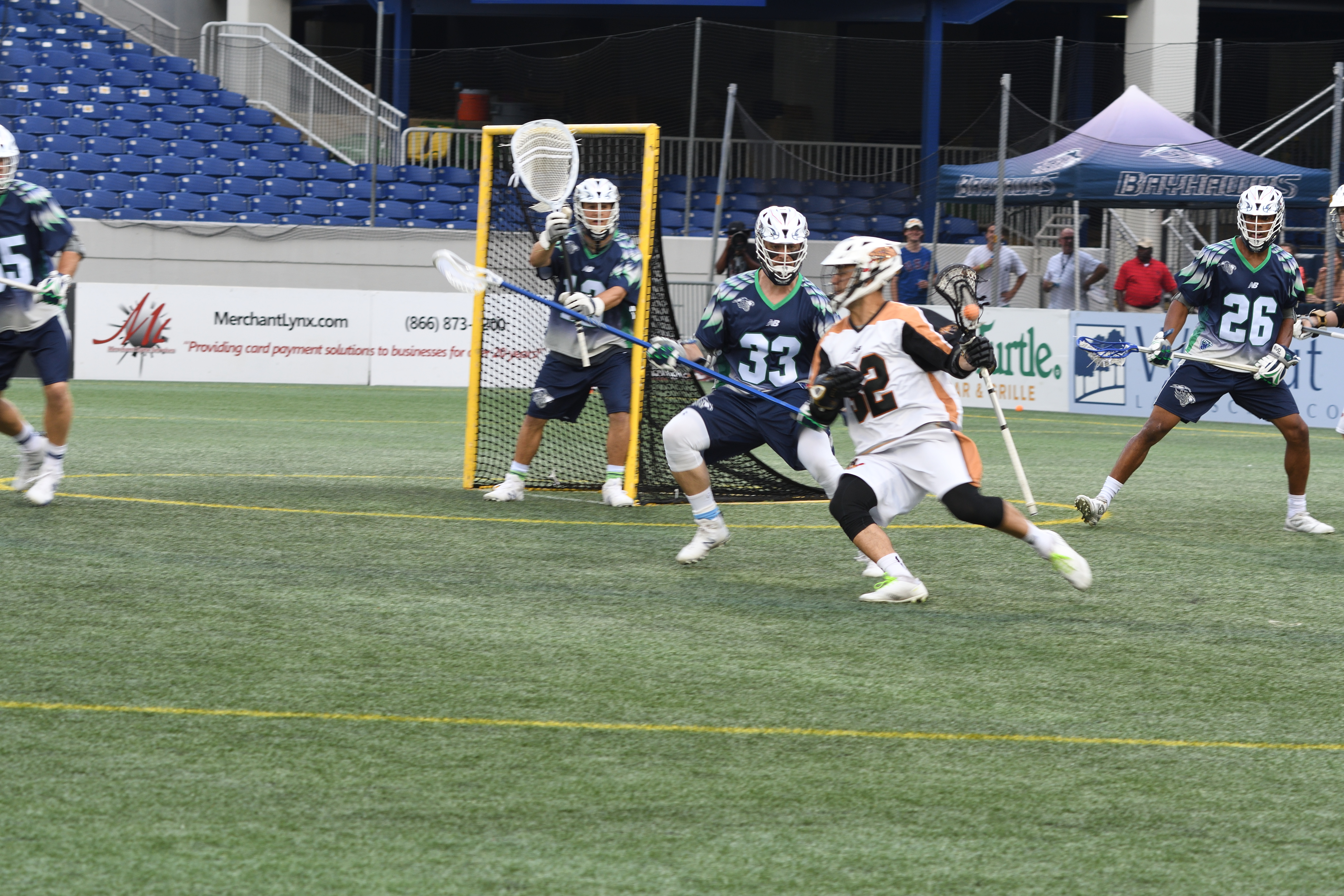
Rochester at Chesapeake, 2011

After their third title in four years in 2013, the Bayhawks missed the playoffs in the following four seasons, the second time in franchise history. In 2016, seven teams finished tied atop the standings at 8–6, including the Bayhawks. Due to tiebreaker procedures, the Bayhawks were left out of the playoffs.

In 2017, the Bayhawks started the season 3–1, but a four-game losing streak put them in a bad position at 3–5. The Bayhawks were finally able to regain some momentum but were ultimately eliminated with a loss during the second-to-last week of the regular season. They finished the season on a high note though, a 23–19 victory over the defending champion Denver Outlaws. In the game, rookie Josh Byrne scored seven goals and finished 2017 with the Major League Lacrosse record for goals in a season for a rookie with 39. The win put them at an even 7-7, but did not prevent them from extending their playoff drought to four seasons. On September 14, the Bayhawks announced that head coach Brian Reese would not be returning because the team wanted a full-time coach, the league's first. On December 13, the Bayhawks announced they were bringing back Dave Cottle as head coach.

The Bayhawks were developing plans for a $40 million 10,000-seat stadium on the grounds of the former Crownsville State Hospital that would have included a three-story team headquarters. The project's first phase would be a 6,000 seat amphitheater that the Bayhawks hope to be playing in by 2020, while phase two would include 20 youth fields but the local community raised significant objections to the plans.

=== Cottle returns as head coach ===
The Bayhawks new and old head coach Dave Cottle began the 2018 campaign at home against the Dallas Rattlers, who were playing in their first game since relocating from Rochester. The Rattlers defeated the Bayhawks 15–9. On April 28, the Bayhawks collected their first win of the season and Cottle's second tenure with a 14–11 victory over the Florida Launch.

After a 1–2 start, the Bayhawks would rattle off seven straight victories, including back-to-back wins over the defending champion Ohio Machine, a team who swept them the season before. The Bayhawks would drop three of their last four contests of the regular season, but at 9–5, the team still earned second place and a home playoff game in the 2018 postseason.

In their first playoff appearance since 2013, the Bayhawks lost a close game to the Denver Outlaws, 13–12, despite defeating the Outlaws twice in the regular season. It was only the Bayhawks' second playoff loss in five trips to the postseason since becoming the Chesapeake Bayhawks in 2010.

After the 2018 season, the professional lacrosse landscape changed drastically with the launch of the Premier Lacrosse League and the migration of nearly 150 Major League Lacrosse players to the upstart league. In addition, the number of MLL teams was shaved from nine to six, as two teams folded and one (Charlotte) went on a hiatus. In the new-look MLL, the Bayhawks took advantage. Led by Lyle Thompson, who would win league MVP and offensive player of the year honors, Chesapeake would finish a league-best 10–6 in the regular season. Despite this, the Bayhawks would essentially have to play as the road team as they eventually made it to the championship game, played at Dick's Sporting Goods Park in Denver, where they would face: the Denver Outlaws. In front of an Outlaw-friendly crowd, the Bayhawks stormed out to a 5–0 lead before letting Denver slowly creep back into it. The Outlaws would take their first lead of the game, 9–8, with eight minutes to go. The Bayhawks, though, would persevere with goals from Steele Stanwick and Andrew Kew in the final three minutes. Chesapeake would ultimately win their sixth Steinfeld Cup, and first in six years.

In January 2020, Cottle stepped away as head coach. He was replaced by Tom Mariano, who had previously served as an assistant to Cottle.

== Rivalry ==
The Bayhawks' biggest rival were the New York Lizards. They faced each other in five Steinfeld Cup championships: the first three, in 2005, and in 2010. The Lizards won in 2001 and 2003, the Bayhawks in 2002, 2005, and 2010. Both Long Island and the Baltimore area try to claim bragging rights to be the top "hotbed" of producing lacrosse talent.

== Roster ==
2020 Chesapeake Bayhawks
#	Name	Nationality	Position	Height	Weight	College
1	Sam Lucchesi	(United States)	G	5 ft 11 in	165 lb	Hobart
2	Colin Heacock	(United States)	M	6 ft 3 in	210 lb	Maryland
4	Lyle Thompson	(Haudenosaunee)	A	6 ft 0 in	180 lb	Albany
9	C.J. Costabile	(United States)	D	6 ft 1 in	205 lb	Duke
11	Nate Solomon	(United States)	A	5 ft 10 in	189 lb	Syracuse
12	Ryan Tucker	(United States)	M	6 ft 2 in	200 lb	Virginia
13	Leo Stouros	(Canada)	D	N/A	N/A	Colgate
16	Ryan Keenan	(United States)	M	5 ft 9 in	165 lb	Penn State
17	Nick Chaykowsky	(Canada)	M	6 ft 4 in	207 lb	Trent
20	Nick Manis	(United States)	M	6 ft 0 in	190 lb	Maryland
21	Grant Maloof	(United States)	M	6 ft 0 in	185 lb	Towson
22	Greg Danseglio	(United States)	D	6 ft 0 in	185 lb	Maryland
23	Nick Mariano	(United States)	M	6 ft 0 in	181 lb	Syracuse
24	Jon Paige	(United States)	FO	6 ft 0 in	210 lb	Queens
25	Luke Anderson	(United States)	SSDM	6 ft 3 in	210 lb	Marquette
26	Isaiah Davis-Allen	(United States)	M	6 ft 3 in	180 lb	Maryland
27	Warren Jeffrey	(Canada)	D	6 ft 3 in	210 lb	Vermont
30	Brian Phipps	(United States)	G	5 ft 9 in	190 lb	Maryland
34	Chase Levesque	(United States)	LSM	6 ft 3 in	195 lb	Boston University
42	Andrew Kew	(Canada)	A	6 ft 3 in	210 lb	Tampa
44	Shane Simpson	(Canada)	M	6 ft 1 in	190 lb	North Carolina
45	Brendan Bomberry	(Haudenosaunee)	M	6 ft 1 in	198 lb	Syracuse
50	Zach Melillo	(United States)	FO	5 ft 10 in	175 lb	Marquette
70	Holden Garlent	(Canada)	D	6 ft 2 in	189 lb	Canisius
81	Will Weitzel	(United States)	LSM	6 ft 1 in	205 lb	Yale
88	Mike Panepinto	(United States)	M	5 ft 11 in	200 lb	Brown
	Callum Crawford	(Canada)	M	6 ft 3 in	196 lb	Dowling

- Roster as of 18 July 2020

== MLL award winners ==
Most Valuable Player

- Greg Cattrano: 2002
- Gary Gait: 2005
- Lyle Thompson: 2019

Rookie of the Year

- Brodie Merrill: 2005
- Matt Ward: 2006
- Josh Byrne: 2017

Defensive Player of the Year

- Rob Doerr: 2001

Offensive Player of the Year

- Mark Millon: 2002, 2003
- Lyle Thompson: 2019

Goalie of the Year

- Greg Cattrano: 2001, 2002
- Niko Amato: 2018

Most Improved Player

- Peet Poillon: 2010

== Season-by-season ==
Chesapeake Bayhawks Season Records
Year	W	L	Pct	Regular season finish	Playoffs
Baltimore Bayhawks
2001	10	4	.714	1st in National Division	Won semifinal 12–11 over Cannons; Lost championship 15–11 to Lizards
2002	10	4	.714	1st in National Division	Won semifinal 15–10 over Cannons; Won championship 21–13 over Lizards
2003^{[a]}	7	4	.636	1st in National Division	Won semifinal 15–13 over Pride; Lost championship 15-14 (OT) to Lizards
2004	7	5	.583	2nd in National Division	Lost semifinal 24–16 to Cannons
2005	10	2	.883	1st in National Division	Won semifinal 20–13 over Rattlers; Won championship 15–9 over Lizards
2006	4	8	.333	6th in Eastern Conference	–
Totals (BAL)	48	27	.640		2 Championships 6 – 3 (.667)
Washington Bayhawks
2007	5	7	.417	5th in Eastern Conference	–
2008	4	8	.333	6th in Eastern Conference	–
2009	5	7	.417	5th in League	–
Totals (WAS)	14	22	.389		–
Chesapeake Bayhawks
2010	6	6	.500	4th in League	Won semifinal 13–9 over Cannons; Won championship 13–9 over Lizards
2011	6	6	.500	4th in League	Lost semifinal 14–13 to Cannons
2012	10	4	.714	2nd in League	Won semifinal 16–10 over Cannons; Won championship 16–6 over Outlaws
2013	9	5	.643	2nd in League	Won semifinal 13–12 over Nationals; Won championship 10–9 over Hounds
2014	5	9	.357	6th in League	–
2015	6	8	.429	6th in League	–
2016	8	6	.571	6th in League	–
2017	7	7	.500	6th in League	–
2018	9	5	.643	2nd in League	Lost semifinal 13–12 to Outlaws
2019	10	6	.625	1st in League	Won semifinal 14–13 over Blaze; Won championship 10–9 over Outlaws
2020	3	2	.600	3rd in League	Semifinal vs. Hammerheads canceled
Totals (CHE)	79	64	.552		4 Championships 8 – 2 (.750)
Franchise Totals	141	113	.555		6 Championships 14 – 5 (.706)

^{[a]} August 17 game at Long Island canceled due to rain

== Head coaches ==
#	Name	Seasons Coached	Regular season				Playoffs			
#	Name	Seasons Coached	GP	W	L	Pct	GP	W	L	Pct
1	Brian Voelker	2001	14	10	4	.714	2	1	1	.500
2	Gary Gait	2003–2005	49	34	15	.694	7	5	2	.714
3	Scott Hiller	2006–2007	24	9	15	.375	–	–	–	-
4	Jarred Testa	2008	12	4	8	.333	–	–	–	-
5	John Tucker	2009–2010	21	9	12	.429	–	–	–	-
6	Brendan Kelly	2010–2011	15	8	7	.533	3	2	1	.666
7	Brian Reese	2016–2017	28	15	13	.536	–	–	–	-
8	Dave Cottle	2012–2015, 2018–2019	86	49	37	.570	7	6	1	.857
9	Tom Mariano	2020	5	3	2	.600			0	.
