= 2006 Major League Lacrosse season =

2006 MLL season
- League: Major League Lacrosse
- Sport: Field lacrosse
- Duration: May 2006 – August 2006
- Teams: 10

MLL seasons
- ← 2005 season 2007 season →

The 2006 Major League Lacrosse season was the sixth season of the league. The season began on May 20 and concluded with the championship game on August 27, 2006.

== General information ==
The season marked the first expansion teams in the MLL. Chicago Machine, Denver Outlaws, Los Angeles Riptide and San Francisco Dragons made up the new Western Conference. The original six teams formed the Eastern Conference.

New Jersey moved its home games to Yurcak Field and Rochester moved its home games to PAETEC Park.

On April 21, MLL announced a trade involving six teams and 24 players and draft picks. MLL believes it to be the largest trade in sports history.

The June 29 game between Boston at Philadelphia was called with 13:00 remaining in the fourth quarter due to a lightning storm. Boston won the game 16-5.

The Chicago Machine became the first MLL team to go a whole season without a victory after losing in overtime to San Francisco on August 12.

== Regular season ==
W = Wins, L = Losses, PTS = Points, PCT = Winning Percentage, GF = Goals For, 2ptGF = 2 point Goals For, GA = Goals Against, 2ptGA = 2 point Goals Against

Qualified for playoffs

Eastern Conference
Team	W	L	PTS	PCT	GF	2ptGF	GA	2ptGA
Philadelphia Barrage	10	2	20	.833	172	7	136	3
Boston Cannons	8	4	16	.667	177	11	162	10
New Jersey Pride	5	7	10	.417	169	12	166	15
Long Island Lizards	5	7	10	.417	147	12	139	9
Rochester Rattlers	5	7	10	.417	152	10	159	10
Baltimore Bayhawks	4	8	8	.333	156	10	197	14

Western Conference
Team	W	L	PTS	PCT	GF	2ptGF	GA	2ptGA
Denver Outlaws	10	2	20	.833	197	22	148	14
San Francisco Dragons	7	5	14	.583	179	13	170	12
Los Angeles Riptide	6	6	12	.500	148	8	150	10
Chicago Machine	0	12	0	.000	126	8	196	16

New Jersey finished 3rd in the East based on overall conference record (5-5) versus (4-6) for both Long Island and Rochester. Long Island finished 4th based on total points scored margin in games against Rochester (+10).

== All Star Game ==

July 6, 2006

- Team USA 18-10 MLL All Stars at Nickerson Field Boston, Massachusetts Kevin Cassese of Team USA MVP

== Playoffs ==
Semi-finals August 25 @ Home Depot Center, Carson, California
Denver 23-14 San Francisco
Philadelphia 17-12 Boston

Championship August 27 @ Home Depot Center, Carson, California
Philadelphia 23-12 Denver

== Bracket ==
Semifinal
E1	Philadelphia	17
E2	Boston	12
W1	Denver	23
W2	San Francisco	14

Steinfeld Cup Final
E1	Philadelphia	23
W1	Denver	12

== Awards ==
Award	Winner	Team
MVP Award	Ryan Powell	San Francisco
Rookie of the Year Award	Matt Ward	Baltimore
Coach of the Year Award	Tony Resch	Philadelphia
Defensive player of the Year Award	Brodie Merrill	Rochester
Offensive player of the Year Award	Ryan Powell	San Francisco
Goaltender of the Year Award	Brian Dougherty	Philadelphia
Sportsman of the Year Award	Michael Culver	Chicago
Most Improved Player of the Year Award	Johnny Christmas	Boston
