= NCAA Division I men's lacrosse records =

NCAA Division I men's lacrosse records listed here are primarily records compiled by the NCAA's Director of Statistics office.

Included in this consolidation are the NCAA men's Division I individual single-season and career leaders. Official NCAA men's lacrosse records did not begin until the 1971 season and are based on information submitted to the NCAA statistics service by institutions participating in the weekly statistics rankings, which started in 1996. Career records include players who played at least three seasons (in a four-season career) or two (in a three-season career) in Division I during the era of official NCAA statistics. In statistical rankings, the rounding of percentages and/or averages may indicate ties where none exist. In these cases, the numerical order of the rankings is accurate.

== Career leaders ==
=== Points ===
Player	Team	Years	Games	Goals	Assists	Points
Chris Gray	BU / UNC	2018-2022	71	204	197	401
Lyle Thompson	Albany	2012-2015	70	175	225	400
Michael Sowers	Princeton / Duke	2017-2021	64	158	225	383
Pat Spencer	Loyola	2016–19	68	149	231	380
Connor Fields	Albany	2015–18	69	199	165	364
Matt Brandau	Yale	2019–24	70	198	162	360
Rob Pannell	Cornell	2009–13	72	150	204	354
Matt Danowski	Duke	2004–08	80	170	183	353 ^{[a]}
Justin Guterding	Duke	2015–18	76	212	139	351
CJ Kirst	Cornell	2022–25	67	247	98	345
Asher Nolting	High Point	2018–2022	66	143	198	344
Joe Vasta	Air Force	1983–86	56	173	170	343
Logan Wisnauskas	Maryland	2018–2022	75	205	135	340
Connor Shellenberger	Virginia	2021-2024	68	131	192	323
Tim Nelson	NC St. / Syracuse	1982 / 1983–85	57	99	221	320
Dylan Molloy	Brown	2014–17	63	197	121	318
Darren Lowe	Brown	1989–92	61	111	205	316
Ben Reeves	Yale	2015–18	67	174	142	316
Chris Cameron	Lehigh	1986–89	55	122	186	308 ^{[b]}
Mike Powell	Syracuse	2001–04	66	150	157	307
Brennan O'Neill	Duke	2021–24	72	207	100	307
Tony Asterino	Siena	1978–81	47	168	136	304
Jordan Wolf	Duke	2011–14	81	184	120	304
Pat Kavanagh	Notre Dame	2020–24	62	117	184	301
Mike French	Cornell	1974–76	47	191	105	296
Miles Thompson	Albany	2011–14	61	190	105	295
Ryan Lanchbury	Richmond	2018–22	70	162	131	293
Josh Zawada	Michigan / Duke	2020–23 / 2024	70	152	139	291
Jared Bernhardt	Maryland	2017–21	76	202	88	290
Casey Powell	Syracuse	1995–98	58	158	129	287
Ryan Powell	Syracuse	1997–2000	61	137	150	287
Jackson Morrill	Yale / Denver	2017–2021	74	145	142	287
Grant Ament	Penn State	2016–20	55	93	192	285
Zack Greer	Duke	2005–08	67	206	79	285 ^{[c]}
Scott Montgomery	Vermont	1983–86	53	78	205	283
Tim O’Hara	Syracuse	1977–80	56	124	158	282
Stan Cockerton	North Carolina St.	1977–80	44	193	87	280
Jeff Spooner	Massachusetts	1974–77	53	134	141	275
Randy Colley	Notre Dame	1992–95	55	173	100	273
Brian LaMastro	Hartford	1999–2002	61	140	129	269
Steele Stanwick	Virginia	2009–12	69	126	143	269
Jeff Teat	Cornell	2017–2020	51	116	152	268
John Zulberti	Syracuse	1986–89	60	109	158	267
Mac O'Keefe	Penn State	2017-2021	66	221	48	269
Jim McAleavey	Massachusetts	1988–91	57	95	171	266
Connor Cannizzaro	Maryland / Denver	2014 / 2015–17	69	171	88	259
Tom Marechek	Syracuse	1989–92	58	182	76	258
Matt Rambo	Maryland	2014–17	75	155	102	257
Eamon McEneaney	Cornell	1975–77	46	92	164	256
Wesley Berg	Denver	2012–15	73	188	67	255
Kieran McArdle	St. John's	2011–14	56	125	129	254
Gary Gait	Syracuse	1987–90	56	192	61	253
Anthony DiMarzo	Delaware	1992–95	58	98	153	251
Terry Gilmore	Ohio State	1976-79	53	123	127	250
Pat Kelly	Holy Cross	1984-87	66	125	125	250
Cort Knodel	Canisius	1994-97	58	172	78	250
Doug Knight	Virginia	1994-97	60	165	84	249
Kevin Lowe	Princeton	1994-97	60	165	84	249
Terry Riordan	Johns Hopkins	1992-95	56	184	63	247
Matt Callaghan	Fairfield	1995-98	60	146	101	247
Rob Kavovit	Syracuse	1993-97	59	125	121	246
Joey Spallina	Syracuse	2022-Present	52	108	138	246
Brian Piccola	Johns Hopkins	1991-95	55	154	91	245

^{[a]} Granted a fifth season of eligibility
^{[b]} Lehigh records have Cameron with 308 career points, while NCAA record book shows Cameron with 307 career points.
^{[c]} Zach Greer's career points mark of 353 points is not officially recognized by the NCAA. Greer was granted a fifth season of eligibility and Bryant was considered a reclassifying institution that year. The NCAA lists Greer's career points as 285, though he scored 42 goals with 26 assists for 68 points in 2009, for a total of 353 career points.

=== Points per game ===
Player	Team	Years	Games	Goals	Assists	Points	PPG
Tony Asterino	Siena	1978–81	47	168	136	304	6.47
Stan Cockerton	North Carolina St.	1977–80	44	193	87	280	6.36
Mike French	Cornell	1974–76	47	191	105	296	6.30
James Trenz	Penn State / Cornell	1971–72 / 1974	34	117	94	211	6.21
Joe Vasta	Air Force	1983–86	56	173	170	343	6.13 ^{[a]}
Michael Sowers	Princeton / Duke	2017–2021	64	158	225	383	5.98
Dennis Fink	Drexel	1976–78	35	80	126	206	5.89
Tim Goldstein	Cornell	1987–88	29	46	122	168	5.79
Lyle Thompson	Albany	2012–15	70	175	225	400	5.71
Chris Gray	Boston University/UNC	2018–2022	71	204	197	401	5.64
Tim Nelson	NC St. / Syracuse	1982 / 1983–85	57	99	221	320	5.61
Jack Thomas	Johns Hopkins	1972–74	40	103	121	224	5.60
Chris Cameron	Lehigh	1986–89	55	122	186	308	5.60
Pat Spencer	Loyola	2016–19	68	149	231	380	5.59
Eamon McEneaney	Cornell	1975–77	46	92	164	256	5.57
John Grant, Jr.	Delaware	1998–99	32	96	81	177	5.53
Brendan Nichtern	Army	2019–22	53	116	168	284	5.36
Scott Montgomery	Vermont	1983–86	53	78	205	283	5.34
Connor Fields	Albany	2015–18	69	199	165	364	5.28
Jeff Teat	Cornell	2017–2020	51	116	152	268	5.25
Grant Ament	Penn State	2016–20	55	93	192	285	5.18
Jeff Spooner	Massachusetts	1974–77	53	134	141	275	5.18
Darren Lowe	Brown	1989–92	61	111	205	316	5.19
CJ Kirst	Cornell	2022–2025	67	247	98	345	5.15
Matt Brandau	Yale	2019–2024	70	198	162	360	5.14
Asher Nolting	High Point	2018–22	67	146	198	344	5.13
Frank Urso	Maryland	1973–76	41	127	81	208	5.07 ^{[a]}
Tom Baldwin	Siena	1978–81	47	142	96	238	5.06
Dylan Molloy	Brown	2014–17	63	197	121	318	5.05
Tim O’Hara	Syracuse	1977–80	56	124	158	282	5.04
Randy Colley	Notre Dame	1992–95	55	173	100	273	4.96
Casey Powell	Syracuse	1995–98	58	158	129	287	4.95
Rob Pannell	Cornell	2009–13	72	150	204	354	4.92
Pete von Hoffmann	Bucknell	1976–79	45	82	138	220	4.89

^{[a]} Not recognized by the NCAA

=== Goals ===
Player	Team	Years	Games	Goals
CJ Kirst	Cornell	2022–25	67	247
Payton Cormier	Virginia	2020–24	73	224
Mac O’Keefe	Penn State	2017–21	66	221
Justin Guterding	Duke	2015–18	75	212
Dyson Williams	Duke	2020–24	78	212
Brennan O'Neill	Duke	2021–24	72	207
Zack Greer	Duke	2005–08	67	206 ^{[a]}
Logan Wisnauskas	Maryland	2018–22	75	205
Chris Gray	Boston U / UNC	2018–22	71	204
Jared Bernhardt	Maryland	2017–21	76	202
Max Quinzani	Duke	2007–10	78	199
Connor Fields	Albany	2015–18	69	199
Matt Brandau	Yale	2019–24	70	198
Dylan Molloy	Brown	2014–17	63	197
Kevin Lindley	Loyola Maryland	2018–22	72	196
Jake Carraway	Georgetown	2017–20	70	195
Stan Cockerton	North Carolina St.	1977–80	44	193
Gary Gait	Syracuse	1987–90	56	192
Mac O'Keefe	Penn State	2017–20	55	192
Mike French	Cornell	1974–76	47	191
Miles Thompson	Albany	2011–14	61	190
Merrick Thomson	Albany	2004–07	65	188
Wesley Berg	Denver	2012–15	73	188
Mike Robinson	Delaware	2020–24	66	185
Jordan Wolf	Duke	2011–14	81	184
Terry Riordan	Hopkins	1992–95	56	184
Tom Marechek	Syracuse	1989–92	58	182
Brody Eastwood	Stony Brook	2013–16	66	182
Ethan Walker	Denver	2017–21	70	181
Ty Kurtz	Delaware	2019–23	67	180
John DiMento	Air Force	1987–90	62	176
Jeff Reh	Adelphi	1987–90	53	175
David Hope	VMI	1986–89	54	175
Jordan McBride	Stony Brook	2008–11	60	175
Lyle Thompson	Albany	2012–15	70	175
Ben Reeves	Yale	2015–18	67	174
Randy Colley	Notre Dame	1992–95	55	173
Joe Vasta	Air Force	1983–86	56	173
Cort Knodel	Canisius	1994–97	58	172
Connor Cannizzaro	Maryland / Denver	2014–17	69	171
Matt Danowski	Duke	2004–08	80	170
Tony Asterino	Siena	1978–81	47	168
Joseph Radin	Marist	2013–16	63	166
Doug Knight	Virginia	1994–97	60	165
Peter Baum	Colgate	2010–13	62	164

^{[a]} Zach Greer's career goals of 248 are not officially recognized by the NCAA, because Greer was granted a fifth season of eligibility and Bryant was considered a reclassifying institution. Greer scored 42 goals in 2009 for Bryant.

=== Goals per game ===
Player	Team	Years	Games	Goals	GPG
Stan Cockerton	North Carolina St.	1977–80	44	193	4.39
Mike French	Cornell	1974–76	47	191	4.06
Brooks Sweet	Massachusetts	1978–79	27	106	3.93
CJ Kirst	Cornell	2022–25	67	247	3.69
Tony Asterino	Siena	1978–81	47	168	3.57
Oliver Marti	Brown	1991–93	41	144	3.51
Jim Trenz	Penn State / Cornell	1971–72 / 1974	34	117	3.44
Gary Gait	Syracuse	1987–90	56	192	3.43
Frank Garahan	Massachusetts	1973, 1975	27	91	3.37
Mac O’Keefe	Penn State	2017–21	66	221	3.35
Jeff Reh	Adelphi	1987–90	53	175	3.30
Terry Riordan	Johns Hopkins	1992–95	56	184	3.29
David Hope	VMI	1986-89	54	175	3.24
Jeff Miller	Drexel	1974–77	46	147	3.20
Randy Colley	Notre Dame	1992–95	55	173	3.15
Tom Marechek	Syracuse	1989–92	58	182	3.14
Dylan Molloy	Brown	2014–17	63	197	3.13

=== Assists ===
Player	Team	Years	Games	Assists
Pat Spencer	Loyola	2016–19	68	231
Lyle Thompson	Albany	2012–15	70	225
Michael Sowers	Princeton / Duke	2017–21	64	225
Tim Nelson	NC St. / Syracuse	1982 / 1983–85	57	221
Scott Montgomery	Vermont	1983–86	54	205
Darren Lowe	Brown	1989–92	61	205
Rob Pannell	Cornell	2009–13	72	204
Asher Nolting	High Point	2018–22	67	198
Grant Ament	Penn State	2016–20	55	192
Connor Shellenberger	Virginia	2021–24	68	192
Chris Gray	Boston University/UNC	2018–22	71	197
Chris Cameron	Lehigh	1986–89	55	186 ^{[a]}
Pat Kavanagh	Notre Dame	2020–24	62	184
Matt Danowski	Duke	2004–08	80	183 ^{[b]}
Kevin Lowe	Princeton	1991–94	57	174
James MacAleavy	Massachusetts	1988–91	57	171
Joe Vasta	Air Force	1983–86	56	170
Brendan Nichtern	Army	2019–22	53	168
Ryan Bell	Providence	2022–25	59	168
Connor Fields	Albany	2015–18	69	165
Eamon McEneaney	Cornell	1975–77	46	164
Ryan Boyle	Princeton	2001–04	57	162
Matt Brandau	Yale	2019–24	70	162
Tim Whiteley	Virginia	1993–96	63	159
Tim O’Hara	Syracuse	1977–80	56	158
John Zulberti	Syracuse	1986–89	60	158
Mike Powell	Syracuse	2001–04	66	157
Anthony DiMarzo	Delaware	1992–95	58	153

^{[a]} Lehigh record books show Cameron with 186 career assists while NCAA records have Cameron with 185.
^{[b]} Granted a fifth season of eligibility

=== Assists per game ===
Player	Team	Years	Games	Assists	APG
Tim Goldstein	Cornell	1987–88	29	122	4.21
Tim Nelson	NC St. / Syracuse	1982; 1983–85	57	221	3.88
Scott Montgomery	Vermont	1983–86	54	205	3.80
Dennis Fink	Drexel	1976–78	35	126	3.60
Eamon McEneaney	Cornell	1975–77	46	164	3.57
Michael Sowers	Princeton / Duke	2017–21	64	225	3.52
Grant Ament	Penn State	2016–20	55	192	3.50
Pat Spencer	Loyola	2016–19	68	231	3.40
Chris Cameron	Lehigh	1986–89	55	185	3.36
Darren Lowe	Brown	1989–92	61	205	3.36
Kris Snider	Virginia	1975–78	43	144	3.35
Jay Connor	Virginia	1971–72	27	88	3.26
Lyle Thompson	Albany	2012–15	70	225	3.21
Brendan Nichtern	Army	2019–22	53	168	3.17
Pete von Hoffmann	Bucknell	1976–79	45	138	3.07
Jack Thomas	Johns Hopkins	1972–74	40	121	3.03
Jim McAleavey	Massachusetts	1988–91	57	171	3.00
Pat Kavanagh	Notre Dame	2020–24	62	184	2.97
Asher Nolting	High Point	2018–22	67	198	2.96
Kevin Lowe	Princeton	1991–94	60	174	2.90
Chris Gray	Boston University/UNC	2018–22	62	178	2.89
Tony Asterino	Siena	1978–81	47	136	2.89
Tom Aiello	Adelphi	1989–92	52	150	2.88
Ryan Bell	Providence	2022–25	59	168	2.85
Ryan Boyle	Princeton	2001–04	57	162	2.84
Rob Pannell	Cornell	2009–13	72	204	2.83
Tim O’Hara	Syracuse	1977–80	56	158	2.82

== Single-season leaders ==
=== Points ===
Player	Team	Year	Games	Goals	Assists	Points
Lyle Thompson	Albany	2014	18	51	77	128
Grant Ament	Penn State	2019	17	30	96	126
Lyle Thompson	Albany	2015	19	52	69	121
Miles Thompson	Albany	2014	18	82	37	119
Connor Fields	Albany	2017	18	55	62	117
Dylan Molloy	Brown	2016	18	62	54	116
CJ Kirst	Cornell	2025	19	82	33	115
Ben Reeves	Yale	2018	20	62	53	115
Steve Marohl	UMBC	1992	15	37	77	114
Pat Spencer	Loyola	2019	17	49	65	114
Lyle Thompson	Albany	2013	17	50	63	113
Justin Guterding	Duke	2018	20	66	47	113
Mike Rooney	Stony Brook	2015	18	48	63	111
Chris Gray	Boston U	2019	17	49	62	111
John Grant Jr.	Delaware	1999	17	56	54	110
Joe Vasta	Air Force	1986	17	33	75	108
Mike French	Cornell	1976	16	65	40	105
Tim Nelson	Syracuse	1984	16	36	67	103
Logan Wisnauskas	Maryland	2022	18	61	42	103
Jordan Wolf	Duke	2014	20	64	39	103
Darren Lowe	Brown	1992	16	36	66	102
Rob Pannell	Cornell	2013	18	47	55	102
Jerry Simandl	Hofstra	1955	16	44	58	102 ^{[a]}
Matt Brandau	Yale	2024	15	44	57	101
Chet Nowak	Air Force	1981	13	51	50	101
Brendan Nichtern	Army	2022	16	41	60	101
Matt Brandau	Yale	2024	15	44	57	101
Tim Goldstein	Cornell	1987	14	27	73	100
Matt Brandau	Yale	2022	17	57	42	99
Jared Bernhardt	Maryland	2021	16	71	28	99
Jason O’Neill	Yale	1990	18	26	73	99
Jeff Teat	Cornell	2018	18	37	62	99
George Paletta Jr.	Holy Cross	1984	18	52	46	98
Bill Woolford	Air Force	1975	9	51	47	98
Jim Weller	Massachusetts	1981	15	62	36	98
Dennis Fink	Drexel	1978	12	35	63	98
Mike French	Cornell	1975	17	63	34	97
Jon Reese	Yale	1990	18	82	15	97
Joe Vasta	Air Force	1985	14	39	58	97

[a] - Not recognized by the NCAA

=== Points per game in one season ===
Player	Team	Year	Games	Goals	Assists	Points	PPG
Bill Woolford	Air Force	1975	9	51	47	98	10.89 ^{[a]}
Dennis Fink	Drexel	1978	12	35	63	98	8.17
Tony Asterino	Siena	1980	11	47	42	89	8.09
Steve Marohl	UMBC	1992	15	37	77	114	7.60
Tony Asterino	Siena	1979	11	49	34	83	7.55
Tony Asterino	Siena	1981	12	43	47	90	7.50
Grant Ament	Penn State	2019	17	30	96	126	7.41
Tim Goldstein	Cornell	1987	14	27	73	100	7.14
Kris Snider	Virginia	1977	9	22	42	64	7.11
Lyle Thompson	Albany	2014	18	51	77	128	7.11
Peter Cleary	Marist	1986	13	47	45	92	7.08
James Trenz	Penn State	1972	10	42	28	70	7.00
Joe Vasta	Air Force	1985	14	39	58	97	6.93 ^{[a]}
Stan Cockerton	North Carolina St.	1979	11	51	25	76	6.91
Walter Bajkowski	Drexel	1972	14	36	60	96	6.86 ^{[a]}
Matt Brandau	Yale	2024	15	44	57	101	6.73
Mike French	Cornell	1974	14	63	31	94	6.71
Pat Spencer	Loyola	2019	17	49	65	114	6.71
Brooks Sweet	Massachusetts	1979	13	45	42	87	6.69
Lyle Thompson	Albany	2013	17	50	63	113	6.65
Chris Cameron	Lehigh	1986	14	40	53	93	6.64
Chet Nowak	Air Force	1981	11	37	36	73	6.64
Miles Thompson	Albany	2014	18	82	37	119	6.61

[a] - Not recognized by the NCAA

=== Goals in one season ===
Player	Team	Year	Games	Goals
Jon Reese	Yale	1990	18	82
Miles Thompson	Albany	2014	18	82
CJ Kirst	Cornell	2025	19	82
Mac O'Keefe	Penn State	2019	18	78
Mike McDonald	Air Force	1978	13	74
John DiMento	Air Force	1990	16	71
Jared Bernhardt	Maryland	2021	16	71
Gary Gait	Syracuse	1988	15	70
Max Quinzani	Duke	2010	20	68
Zack Greer	Duke	2007	20	67
Peter Baum	Colgate	2012	18	67
John Piatelli	Cornell	2022	19	66
Justin Guterding	Duke	2018	20	66
Connor Fields	Albany	2015	19	66
CJ Kirst	Cornell	2023	15	65
Mike French	Cornell	1976	16	65
Tucker Dordevic	Georgetown	2023	17	65
Payton Cormier	Virginia	2024	18	65
Zack Greer	Duke	2008	19	65
Jordan Wolf	Duke	2014	20	64
Mike French	Cornell	1974	14	63
Mike French	Cornell	1975	17	63
Justin Zackey	Bucknell	1993	15	63
Kylor Bellistri	Brown	2016	19	63

=== Goals per game in one season ===
Player	Team	Year	Games	Goals	GPG
Bill Woolford	Air Force	1975	9	51	5.66 ^{[a]}
Scott Helgans	Lehigh	1978	12	58	4.83
Stan Cockerton	North Carolina State	1977	11	52	4.72
Gregg Perry	Colgate	1990	11	52	4.72
Jeff Hickey	Dartmouth	1979	12	56	4.67
Gary Gait	Syracuse	1988	15	70	4.67
Stan Cockerton	North Carolina State	1979	11	51	4.64
Jon Reese	Yale	1990	18	82	4.56
Miles Thompson	Albany	2014	18	82	4.56
Mike French	Cornell	1974	14	63	4.50
Tony Asterino	Siena	1979	11	49	4.45
Jared Bernhardt	Maryland	2021	16	71	4.44
Brooks Sweet	Massachusetts	1978	14	61	4.36
Mac O'Keefe	Penn State	2019	18	78	4.33
CJ Kirst	Cornell	2023	15	65	4.33
CJ Kirst	Cornell	2025	19	82	4.32
Tony Asterino	Siena	1980	11	47	4.27
Tracey Kelusky	Hartford	2000	14	59	4.21
Tom Cleaver	Maryland	1971	10	42	4.20
James Trenz	Penn State	1972	10	42	4.20
Justin Zackey	Bucknell	1993	15	63	4.20
Mike Faught	Harvard	1978	14	58	4.14
Jim Weller	Massachusetts	1981	15	62	4.13
Chris Lyons	Yale	2023	15	62	4.13
Stan Cockerton	North Carolina State	1980	11	45	4.09
Mike French	Cornell	1976	16	65	4.06
Jeff Reh	Adelphi	1989	15	60	4.00

[a] Not recognized by the NCAA

=== Assists in one season ===
Player	Team	Year	Games	Assists
Grant Ament	Penn State	2019	17	96
Steve Marohl	UMBC	1992	15	77
Lyle Thompson	Albany	2014	18	77
Joe Vasta	Air Force	1986	17	75
Tim Goldstein	Cornell	1987	14	73
Jason O'Neill	Yale	1990	18	73
Lyle Thompson	Albany	2015	19	69
Tim Nelson	Syracuse	1984	16	67
Darren Lowe	Brown	1992	16	66
Eamon McEneaney	Cornell	1975	17	65
Scott Montgomery	Vermont	1984	14	65
Rick Handelman	Brown	1980	13	65
Pat Spencer	Loyola	2019	18	65
Tim Nelson	Syracuse	1985	16	64
Dennis Fink	Drexel	1978	12	63
Ned Crotty	Duke	2010	20	63
Lyle Thompson	Albany	2013	17	63
Mike Rooney	Stony Brook	2015	18	63
Connor Fields	Albany	2017	18	62
Jeff Teat	Cornell	2018	18	62
Chris Gray	Boston University	2019	17	62
Eamon McEneaney	Cornell	1976	16	61
Scott Montgomery	Vermont	1986	14	61

=== Assists per game ===
Player	Team	Year	Games	Assists	APG
Grant Ament	Penn State	2019	17	96	5.65
Dennis Fink	Drexel	1978	12	63	5.25
Bill Woolford	Air Force	1975	9	47	5.22 ^{[a]}
Tim Goldstein	Cornell	1987	14	73	5.21
Rick Handelman	Brown	1980	13	65	5.00
Kris Snider	Virginia	1977	9	42	4.67
Scott Montgomery	Vermont	1984	14	65	4.64
Scott Montgomery	Vermont	1986	14	61	4.36
Walter Bajkowski	Drexel	1972	14	60	4.29 ^{[a]}
Michael Sowers	Princeton	2018	13	56	4.31
Lyle Thompson	Albany	2014	18	77	4.28
Tim Nelson	Syracuse	1984	16	67	4.19
Jon Danowski	Rutgers	1973	13	54	4.15
Darren Lowe	Brown	1992	16	66	4.13
Steve Marohl	UMBC	1992	15	77	4.11
Spencer Ford	Towson	1999	13	53	4.08
Jason O'Neill	Yale	1990	18	73	4.06
Tim Nelson	Syracuse	1985	16	64	4.00
Rich Mills	Delaware	1975	12	47	3.92
Tony Asterino	Siena	1981	12	47	3.92
Bob Boneillo	Maryland	1978	10	39	3.90
Jay Connor	Virginia	1972	15	58	3.87
Fred Menna	Massachusetts	1977	15	58	3.87
Eamon McEneaney	Cornell	1975	17	65	3.82
Eamon McEneaney	Cornell	1976	16	61	3.81
Matt Brandau	Yale	2024	15	57	3.80
Lyle Thompson	Albany	2013	17	63	3.71
Lyle Thompson	Albany	2015	19	69	3.63
Pat Spencer	Loyola	2019	18	65	3.61
Bobby Griebe	Towson	1975	17	58	3.41

[a] Not recognized by the NCAA

== Most Wins and National Titles by a program ==
The NCAA does not officially recognize lacrosse records prior to 1971, and the USILA does not maintain a database of lacrosse records. USILA era lacrosse records, nonetheless, have been included below. National titles include all NCAA, USILA, all divisions.

Current NCAA Division I lacrosse programs with 480 or more wins through 2022:

University	Initial Season	Total Seasons	All-time Wins	All-time Losses	Total Games	Winning Percent	National Titles
Johns Hopkins	1883	135	1,004	364	1,383	.731	44
Syracuse	1916	103	924	358	1,298	.722	15
Maryland	1924	98	872	277	1,153	.759	13
Navy	1908	114	813	366	1,187	.686	17
Army	1907	104	812	396	1,208	.669	8
Hobart	1898	119	788	512	1,320	.605	16
Cornell	1892	125	774	485	1,285	.612	7
Harvard	1881	134	708	707	1,438	.500	13
Princeton	1881	103	666	460	1,109	.591	12
Yale	1881	101	661	528	1,195	.556	2
Virginia	1925	89	675	376	1,057	.642	9
Rutgers	1887	96	623	522	1,159	.544	2
Lehigh	1885	130	616	707	1,340	.466	11
Duke	1938	82	609	424	1,013	.581	3
Hofstra	1949	73	591	411	990	.589	1
Massachusetts	1954	68	564	316	880	.641	
Penn State	1913	107	549	526	1,083	.511	
Loyola	1938	82	537	408	952	.568	1
Delaware	1948	74	534	474	1,011	.530	
Brown	1926, 1961	57	527	370	901	.587	
Penn	1900	103	519	631	1,159	.452	
North Carolina	1949	63	509	310	768	.621	5
Ohio State	1953	67	498	426	929	.539	
Dartmouth	1926	94	490	606	1,100	.447	
Towson	1958	64	493	370	863	.571	1

== See also ==
- NCAA Division I Men's Lacrosse Championship
- United States Intercollegiate Lacrosse Association
- Wingate Memorial Trophy
