= 1992 NCAA Division I men's lacrosse tournament =

- Teams: 12
- Finals site: Franklin Field, Philadelphia, Pennsylvania
- Champions: Princeton (1st title)
- Runner-up: Syracuse (6th title game)
- Semifinalists: Johns Hopkins (18th Final Four); North Carolina (11th Final Four)
- Winning coach: Bill Tierney (1st title)
- MOP: Scott Bacigalupo, Princeton
- Attendance: 15,023 semi-finals 13,150 finals 28,173 total
- Top scorer: Jeff Wills, Johns Hopkins (19 goals)

The 1992 NCAA Division I lacrosse tournament was the 22nd annual tournament hosted by the National Collegiate Athletic Association to determine the team champion of men's college lacrosse among its Division I programs, held at the end of the 1992 NCAA Division I men's lacrosse season.

Princeton completed a 13-2 season by defeating Syracuse in the championship game in two overtime, 10-9. The win marked the first NCAA tournament title for Princeton and seventh overall college lacrosse national championship.

The championship game was played at Franklin Field in Philadelphia, Pennsylvania, with 13,150 fans in attendance.

== Overview ==
The Tigers upset top-ranked Syracuse who were playing in their fourth Division I final in the prior five years. Syracuse, which had come back from a six goal deficit, lost on Andy Moe's fourth goal of the game nine seconds into the second sudden-death overtime. Princeton's Greg Waller won the overtime faceoff, with Moe retrieving the ground ball and sprinting down the right side for the winning goal. A misplayed clear by Princeton's goalie allowed Tom Marechek to score a virtually empty net goal with 42 seconds left in regulation to tie it.

Only five years before this championship, Princeton had just two wins with thirteen losses.

== Bracket ==
First Round
Yale | 9
8 | Navy | 3
5 | Johns Hopkins | 15
Notre Dame | 7
6 | Maryland | 13
Duke | 11
Brown | 19
7 | Loyola Maryland | 12

Quarterfinals
1 | Syracuse | 17
Yale | 8
4 | Towson State | 8
5 | Johns Hopkins | 15
3 | Princeton | 11
6 | Maryland | 10
2 | North Carolina | 16
Brown | 10

Semifinals
1 | Syracuse | 21
5 | Johns Hopkins | 16
3 | Princeton | 16
2 | North Carolina | 14

Final
1 | Syracuse | 9
3 | Princeton | 10 *

- Asterisk = overtime

== Box scores ==
=== Finals ===
| Team | 1 | 2 | 3 | 4 | OT1 | OT2 | Total |
|---|---|---|---|---|---|---|---|
| Princeton | 3 | 4 | 1 | 1 | 0 | 1 | 10 |
| Syracuse | 0 | 2 | 2 | 5 | 0 | 0 | 9 |
Princeton scoring - Andy Moe 4, John Burstein 1, Torr Marro 1, Scott Reinhardt 1, Brian Tomeo 1, Justin Tortolani 1, Greg Waller 1; Syracuse scoring - Jamie Archer 2, Charlie Lockwood 2, Tom Marechek 2, Matt Riter 2, Dom Fin 1; Shots: Princeton 52, Syracuse 50; Saves: Princeton Scott Bacigalupo 15, Syracuse Chris Surran 14; Attendance: 13,650

=== Semifinals ===
| Team | 1 | 2 | 3 | 4 | Total |
|---|---|---|---|---|---|
| Princeton | 7 | 1 | 5 | 3 | 16 |
| North Carolina | 2 | 4 | 4 | 4 | 14 |
Princeton scoring – Justin Tortolani 3, Kevin Lowe 2, David Morrow 2, Scott Reinhardt 2, Taylor Simmers 2, Brian Tomeo 2, Torr Marro 1, Mal Meistrell 1, Andy Moe 1; North Carolina scoring – Donnie McNichol 3, Ryan Wade 3, Danny Levy 2, Michael Thomas 2, Robin Cornish 1, Dan Donnelly 1, Greg Paradine 1, Steve Speers 1; Shots: North Carolina 45, Princeton 34; Saves: Princeton Scott Bacigalupo 19, North; Carolina Billy Daye 9: Attendance: 15,523

| Team | 1 | 2 | 3 | 4 | Total |
|---|---|---|---|---|---|
| Syracuse | 4 | 4 | 5 | 8 | 21 |
| Johns Hopkins | 3 | 4 | 5 | 4 | 16 |
Syracuse scoring – John Barr 4, Matt Riter 4, Jamie Archer 3, Dom Fin 3, Tom Gilmartin 2, Tom Marechek 2, Roy Colsey 1, Mark Fietta 1, Charlie Lockwood 1; Johns Hopkins scoring – Brian Piccola 4, Brendan Cody 3, Jeff Wills 3, Brian Lukacz 2, Adam Wright 2, Terry Riordan 1, Steve Vecchione 1: Shots: Syracuse 53, Johns Hopkins 47; Saves: Syracuse Chris Surran, Johns Hopkins Scott Giardina 14; Attendance: 15,523

=== Quarterfinals ===
| Team | 1 | 2 | 3 | 4 | Total |
|---|---|---|---|---|---|
| Syracuse | 4 | 3 | 6 | 4 | 17 |
| Yale | 3 | 3 | 1 | 1 | 8 |
Syracuse scoring – Tom Marechek 5, Jamie Archer 3, Charlie Lockwood 3, Steve Bettinger 2, Matt Riter, Roy Colsey, Andy Boland, Dom Fin: Yale scoring – Tony Rousou 2, Simon Duxbury, Nick Deans, Josh McHugh, Rocky Mould, Jeff Curran, Brendan Sheehan: Shots: Syracuse 74, Yale 31; Saves: Yale Rich Dressler 24 - Syracuse Chris Surran 16; Attendance: 3,684

| Team | 1 | 2 | 3 | 4 | Total |
|---|---|---|---|---|---|
| Johns Hopkins | 3 | 5 | 4 | 3 | 15 |
| Towson State | 1 | 3 | 3 | 1 | 8 |
Johns Hopkins scoring – Brian Piccola 6, Brian Lukacz 4, Terry Riordan 3, Adam Wright 2; Towson State scoring – Joe Genovese 3, Tim Barger, Lindsay Dixon, Steve Carcaterra, John Blatchley, Kevin; Krupinsky: Shots: Johns Hopkins 44, Towson State 40; Saves: Johns Hopkins Scott Giardina 16 - Towson State Jerry DeLorenzo 16; Attendance: 7,812

| Team | 1 | 2 | 3 | 4 | Total |
|---|---|---|---|---|---|
| Princeton | 3 | 2 | 2 | 4 | 11 |
| Maryland | 2 | 1 | 6 | 1 | 10 |
Princeton scoring – Justin Tortolani 4, Ed Calkins 2, Scott Reinhardt 2, Taylor Simmers, Paul Murphy, Greg Waller; Maryland scoring – Matt Parks 3, Erik Elfstrum 3, Andy Claxton, Chris Dail, Dave Willard, Greg Nelin; Shots: Princeton 39, Maryland 32; Saves: Maryland Steve Kavovit 14 - Princeton Scott Bacigalupo 11; Attendance: 2,213

| Team | 1 | 2 | 3 | 4 | Total |
|---|---|---|---|---|---|
| North Carolina | 3 | 3 | 7 | 5 | 16 |
| Brown | 0 | 0 | 1 | 2 | 10 |
North Carolina scoring – Dan Donnelly 2, Joe Bedell 2, Jim Buczek 2, Michael Thomas 2, Eric Seremet 2, Ryan Wade, Steve Schreiber, Danny Levy, Donnie McNichol, Steve Muir, Gregg Langhoff: Brown scoring – Oliver Marti 3, Darren Lowe 2, Rob Gutheil 2, Neil Munro, Chris Martinelli, Phil Maletta; Shots: North Carolina 50, Brown 33; Saves: North Carolina Billy Daye 16 - Brown Pat Flynn 11; Attendance: 2,000

=== First round ===
| Team | 1 | 2 | 3 | 4 | Total |
|---|---|---|---|---|---|
| Yale | 1 | 1 | 4 | 3 | 9 |
| Navy | 1 | 0 | 1 | 1 | 3 |
Yale scoring – Simon Duxbury 4, Josh McHugh 3, Chris Disimile 1, Scott Roberts 1; Navy scoring – Matt Long 1, Thomas Roszko 1, Jamie Slough 1; Shots: Navy 41, Yale 23; Saves: Yale, Rich Dressler 22 - Navy, Kevin Farrington 11; Attendance: 2,618

| Team | 1 | 2 | 3 | 4 | Total |
|---|---|---|---|---|---|
| Johns Hopkins | 3 | 4 | 4 | 4 | 15 |
| Notre Dame | 0 | 0 | 4 | 3 | 7 |
Johns Hopkins scoring – Adam Wright 4, Terry Riordan 3, Jeff Wills 3, Brian Lukacz 2, Brian Piccola 2, Peter Jacobs 1; Notre Dame scoring – Randy Colley 3, Tom Carroll 1, Eddie Lamb 1, Brian Mayglothing 1, Rob Snyder 1; Shots: Johns Hopkins 47, Notre Dame 41; Saves: Johns Hopkins Scott Giardina 21, John Banks 1 - Notre Dame Ryan Jewell 9, Chris; Parent 6 Attendance: 1,794

| Team | 1 | 2 | 3 | 4 | Total |
|---|---|---|---|---|---|
| Maryland | 3 | 4 | 4 | 4 | 13 |
| Duke | 0 | 0 | 4 | 3 | 11 |
Maryland scoring – Chris Dail 3, Blake Wynot 2, Rob Chomo 2, John Schoenweitz 2, Bob Huggins, Sean Crawford, Dan Reading, Brian Burlace; Duke scoring – Joe Matassa 3, Gregg Schmalz 2, Jim Book 2, Ross Moscatelli, Dave Donovan, Andy Droney, Seth McCullough; Shots: Duke 47, Maryland 35; Saves: Maryland Steve Kavovit 14, Duke Carter Hertzberg 12; Attendance: 3,010

| Team | 1 | 2 | 3 | 4 | Total |
|---|---|---|---|---|---|
| Brown | 3 | 4 | 4 | 4 | 19 |
| Loyola Maryland | 0 | 0 | 4 | 3 | 12 |
Brown scoring – Oliver Marti 9, Darren Lowe 3, Neil Munro 2, Rich Levi 2, Rob Gutheil, Chris Martinelli, Gary Nelson; Loyola scoring – Gary Miller 5, Jim Blanding 2, Gene Ubriaco, Bob Curry, Kevin Beach, Kevin Jedlicka, Steve Sovik; Shots: Loyola 56, Brown 48; Saves: Brown Pat Flynn 22, Loyola Tim McGeeney 18; Attendance: 2,251

== All-Tournament Team ==
- Scott Bacigalupo, Princeton (Named the tournament's Most Outstanding Player)

=== Leading scorers ===
| Leading scorers | GP | G | A | Pts |
|---|---|---|---|---|
| Jeff Wills, Johns Hopkins | 3 | 6 | 13 | 19 |
| Jamie Archer, Syracuse | 3 | 8 | 8 | 16 |
| Brian Piccola, Johns Hopkins | 3 | 12 | 3 | 15 |
| Darren Lowe, Brown | 2 | 5 | 9 | 14 |
| Oliver Marti, Brown | 2 | 12 | 1 | 13 |
| Brian Lukacz, Johns Hopkins | 3 | 8 | 3 | 11 |
| Tom Marechek, Syracuse | 3 | 9 | 2 | 11 |
| Justin Tortolani, Princeton | 3 | 8 | 3 | 11 |
| Matt Riter, Syracuse | 3 | 7 | 2 | 9 |
| Adam Wright, Johns Hopkins | 3 | 8 | 1 | 9 |

== See also ==
- 1992 NCAA Division I women's lacrosse tournament
- 1992 NCAA Division III men's lacrosse tournament
