= Chris Cameron =

Chris Cameron may refer to:

- Chris Cameron (lacrosse), American lacrosse player
- Chris Cameron (gymnast) (born 1989), American artistic gymnast
- Chris Cameron (footballer), Australian rules footballer
- Chris Cameron (musician) (born 1957), British musician formerly with Hot Chocolate
