= Marohl =

Marohl is a surname. Notable people with the surname include:

- Dan Marohl (born 1978), American lacrosse player
- Steve Marohl, American lacrosse player
