= Scott Bacigalupo =

Lacrosse player

Personal information
- Nationality: American
- Education: Princeton
- Years active: 1991-1994

Sport
- Sport: Lacrosse
- Position: Goaltender

Scott S. Bacigalupo is a former lacrosse goaltender. He was a high school All-American, four-time collegiate United States Intercollegiate Lacrosse Association (USILA) All-American, three-time National Collegiate Athletic Association (NCAA) goaltender of the year, two-time NCAA tournament outstanding player and a national player of the year. Scott Bacigalupo starred as a member of the Princeton Tigers men's lacrosse team from 1991 through 1994 where he helped them win their first two NCAA Men's Lacrosse Championships and was inducted into the Lacrosse Museum and National Hall of Fame on October 30, 2010. Scott was selected to the NCAA Lacrosse Silver Anniversary team in 1995. He was a four-time All-Ivy League (three times first team) selection. In his four-year college career, Princeton won its first two NCAA tournament Championships, two Ivy League Championships and earned four NCAA Men's Lacrosse Championship tournament invitations.

== Background ==
Scott Bacigalupo was a high school All-American at St. Paul's of Brooklandville, Maryland.

== College career ==
Bacigalupo started all 60 of Princeton's games during his career from 1991 to 1994. During those four years, Princeton posted a 52–8 record, including a 7–2 record in four NCAA tournament appearances. On five occasions he recorded 15 or more saves in an NCAA Division I Men's Lacrosse Championship tournament game, and the Tigers won the NCAA Division I Men's Lacrosse Championship in both 1992 and 1994. The 1992 and 1993 teams were undefeated 6–0 outright Ivy League champions.

Bacigalupo was inducted into the Lacrosse Museum and National Hall of Fame on October 30, 2010. He is a three-time winner of the Ensign C. Markland Kelly, Jr. Award (1992, 1993, 1994) as the NCAA's best goaltender and a former Lt. Raymond Enners Award-winner (1994) as the NCAA Division I lacrosse player of the year. He was a first team USILA All-American Team selection in 1992, 1993, and 1994 and a second team selection in 1991. In addition, he was a 1994 USILA Scholar All-American. He was first team all-Ivy League in 1991, 1992 and 1993 and a second team selection in 1994. His 732 career saves are 122 more than any other Princeton goaltender. Lacrosse Magazine named him to its All-Century team and he participated in the 1994 North/South All-Star Game.

During the 1992 NCAA Division I Men's Lacrosse Championship game against Syracuse, Bacigalupo allowed Syracuse to tie the score when he lost a ball near his own goal, but he made a key save in the first overtime. The Tigers eventually won their first NCAA championship in the second overtime, and Bacigalupo was selected as the most outstanding player of the tournament. Bacigalupo also performed well in the 1993 NCAA Division I Men's Lacrosse Championships and was again the most outstanding player during the 1994 NCAA Division I Men's Lacrosse Championship tournament when the Tigers won the championship for a second time.

== Professional career ==
After college, he took a Wall Street job with Merrill Lynch. Bacigalupo has not played professionally in either the National Lacrosse League or Major League Lacrosse.

== Notes ==
Preceded by Andy Piazza	Ensign C. Markland Kelly, Jr. Award; 1992, 1993, 1994	Succeeded by Brian Dougherty
Preceded by David Morrow	Lt. Raymond Enners Award; 1994	Succeeded by Terry Riordan
Preceded by Dennis Goldstein; Chris Surran	NCAA Men's Lacrosse Championship Tournament Most Outstanding Player; 1992; 1994	Succeeded by Chris Surran; Brian Dougherty
