= Lt. Raymond Enners Award =

Award in American men's college lacrosse

The Lt. Raymond Enners Award is an award given annually to the NCAA's most outstanding player in men's college lacrosse. The award is presented by the United States Intercollegiate Lacrosse Association (USILA) and is named after 1st Lt. Raymond J. Enners, who attended the United States Military Academy, class of 1967, and served in the U.S. Army during the Vietnam War. While leading a platoon, he was killed in combat on September 18, 1968. Enners received the Distinguished Service Cross, the Bronze Star Medal, and the Purple Heart for extraordinary heroism in combat in South Vietnam. He was a member of the 1963 All-Long Island lacrosse team, a 1967 USILA Honorable Mention All-American, and was inducted into the Suffolk County Hall of Fame in 2004. The award was first given in the season immediately after his death. The Lt. Ray Enners Award, another award named after Lt. Enners, is presented annually by the Suffolk County Boys Lacrosse Coaches Association to the outstanding high school player in Suffolk County, New York. Frank Urso is the only athlete who has won both awards, in 1972 and 1975. In 2016, Richard Enners authored the book "Heart of Gray", the story about his brother LT. Raymond J. Enners, Alpha Company, 1-20th Infantry, 11th Brigade and his courage and sacrifice in Vietnam.

== Award Winners by Year ==
Year	Player	Position	School
1969	Joe Cowan	Midfield	Johns Hopkins
1970	Pete Cramblet	Attack	Army
1971	Tom Cafaro	Attack	Army
1972	Pete Eldredge	Midfield	Virginia
1973	Doug Schreiber	Midfield	Maryland
1974	Rick Kowalchuk	Midfield	Johns Hopkins
1975	Frank Urso	Midfield	Maryland
1976	Mike French	Attack	Cornell
1977	Eamon McEneaney	Attack	Cornell
1978	Mike O'Neill	Attack	Johns Hopkins
1979	Mark Greenberg	Defense	Johns Hopkins
1980	Brendan Schneck	Midfield	Johns Hopkins
1981	Jeff Cook	Attack	Johns Hopkins
1982	Tom Sears	Goalie	North Carolina
1983	Brad Kotz	Midfield	Syracuse
1984	Larry Quinn	Goalie	Johns Hopkins
1985	Larry Quinn	Goalie	Johns Hopkins
1986	Tom Haus	Defense	North Carolina
1987	Tim Goldstein	Attack	Cornell
1988	Gary Gait	Attack	Syracuse
1989	Dave Pietramala	Defense	Johns Hopkins
1990	Gary Gait	Attack	Syracuse
1991	Dennis Goldstein	Attack	North Carolina
1992	Darren Lowe	Attack	Brown
1993	David Morrow	Defense	Princeton
1994	Scott Bacigalupo	Goalie	Princeton
1995	Terry Riordan	Attack	Johns Hopkins
1996	Doug Knight	Attack	Virginia
1997	Casey Powell	Attack	Syracuse
1998	Casey Powell	Attack	Syracuse
1999	John Grant	Attack	Delaware
2000	Ryan Powell	Attack	Syracuse
2001	Doug Shanahan	Midfield	Hofstra
2002	Steve Dusseau	Midfield	Georgetown
2003	Tillman Johnson	Goalie	Virginia
2004	Michael Powell	Attack	Syracuse
2005	Kyle Harrison	Midfield	Johns Hopkins
2006	Matt Ward	Attack	Virginia
2007	Matt Danowski	Attack	Duke
2008	Matt Danowski	Attack	Duke
2009	Max Seibald	Midfield	Cornell
2010	Kevin Crowley	Midfield	Stony Brook
2011	Rob Pannell	Attack	Cornell
2012	Peter Baum	Attack	Colgate
2013	Rob Pannell	Attack	Cornell
2014	Lyle Thompson	Attack	Albany
2015	Lyle Thompson	Attack	Albany
2016	Dylan Molloy	Attack	Brown
2017	Matt Rambo	Attack	Maryland
2018	Ben Reeves	Attack	Yale
2019	Pat Spencer	Attack	Loyola
2020	N/A (COVID-19 Pandemic)	N/A	N/A
2021	Jared Bernhardt	Attack	Maryland
2022	Logan Wisnauskas	Attack	Maryland
2023	Brennan O'Neill	Attack	Duke
2024	Ajax Zappitello	Defense	Maryland
2025	CJ Kirst	Attack	Cornell
2026	Aidan Maguire	SSDM	Duke

== Universities with Multiple Award Winners ==
School	Number of Awards	Winning years
Johns Hopkins	11	1969, 1974, 1978, 1979, 1980, 1981, 1984, 1985, 1989, 1995, 2005
Syracuse	7	1983, 1988, 1990, 1997, 1998, 2000, 2004
Cornell	7	1976, 1977, 1987, 2009, 2011, 2013, 2025
Maryland	6	1973, 1975, 2017, 2021, 2022, 2024
Virginia	4	1972, 1996, 2003, 2006
Duke	4	2007, 2008, 2023, 2026
North Carolina	3	1982, 1986, 1991
Army	2	1970, 1971
Brown	2	1992, 2016
Princeton	2	1993, 1994
Albany	2	2014, 2015

== See also ==
- Tewaaraton Outstanding Player Award
- Jack Turnbull Outstanding Attackman Award
- Lt. j.g. Donald MacLaughlin Jr. Outstanding Midfielder Award
- William C. Schmeisser Outstanding Defender Award
- Ensign C. Markland Kelly Jr. Outstanding Goaltender Award
- F. Morris Touchstone Outstanding Coach Award
