= Oliver Marti =

Canadian-born US healthcare investor

- Born: Oliver Marti; 1970 (age 55–56)
- Education: Brown University (B.A.)
- Occupation: US healthcare investor

Oliver Marti is a Canadian-American healthcare investor, hedge fund manager and former professional lacrosse player. He formed the Connecticut-based healthcare hedge fund team CCI Healthcare at investment firm Columbus Circle Investors in 2001 and founded Akera Capital in 2018.

== Early life and education ==
Marti grew up in Richmond, British Columbia, Canada, an avid hockey and lacrosse player. Marti played Junior-A Hockey with the Penticton Knights and the Richmond Sockeyes, then part of the British Columbia Hockey League. He is the son of chef Bruno Marti, who has been called “the most honoured chef in Canada” and was a member of the Canadian Culinary Olympic Team that won the Culinary Olympics in 1984.

Marti attended Brown University and graduated in three years with a double major in economics and business management in 1993. He received the Joslin Award, given to members of the senior graduating class who have contributed significantly to the quality of student life at Brown.

== Lacrosse career ==
Marti began playing lacrosse at a young age, culminating as a top player. He was part of two Canadian Junior-A Championship Minto Cup finals with the Richmond Outlaws before being drafted to play with the Senior-A New Westminster Salmonbellies of the Western Lacrosse Association in 1992, reaching the Canadian Championship Mann Cup finals in that year.

Marti was a member of Brown University's men's lacrosse team from 1991-1993, where he set NCAA Division I men's lacrosse records, including the NCAA tournament record for most goals scored in a game and currently ranks fifth all-time in average goals per game. He was a two-time All-American, All-Ivy, and also an Academic All-American. Marti played alongside other Brown All-Americans including Darren Lowe, Andrew Towers and David Evans. In Marti's first season Brown won the Ivy League Championship and he continues to hold several lacrosse records and accomplishments at Brown and within the Ivy League and NCAA Division I.

After university, Marti played on the Canada men's national lacrosse team alongside some of Canada's greatest players, including twin brothers Gary Gait and Paul Gait, Tom Marechek and John Tavares. Marti was named MVP of the Bronze Medal Game against England in the 1994 World Lacrosse Championship in Manchester, England.

Marti was drafted by the professional lacrosse team New York Saints of the Major Indoor Lacrosse League (known today as the National Lacrosse League). Marti played two seasons with the Saints in 1994 and 1995 playing alongside Sal LoCascio, Pat McCabe, Steve Kisslinger and Mark Millon.

In 2019, Marti founded the CT Collegiate Box Lacrosse League (CTCBLL) as the third US State member of US Box Lacrosse's National Collegiate Box Series. In the inaugural CTCBLL Championship, the Constitutional Cup, the Coyotes, coached by Marti, lost in OT to the Revolution. In that same year, as the Offensive Head Coach, Marti helped the USA U20 Indoor Junior Team capture the Bronze medal at the World Junior Lacrosse Championship (WJLC) in Mississauga, Canada.

As Head Coach of the USA U20 Indoor Junior Team, along with Casey Powell, 2022, Marti again led the team to a bronze medal in the WJLC.

Marti, through his investment vehicle 11|88 LLC, is a major investor in the Premier Lacrosse League (PLL) and an owner of the lacrosse equipment manufacturer Epoch Lacrosse.

In 2021, Marti led a group of investors that purchased the New England Black Wolves of the National Lacrosse League and relocated the team to Albany, NY. The team, renamed the Albany FireWolves, plays out of Albany's MVP Arena.

In their inaugural season, the FireWolves finished fourth in the East Division, losing to the Buffalo Bandits in the first round of the playoffs.

== Investment career ==
Marti began his career in finance in 1993 as a member of Morgan Stanley's investment banking group and later as a healthcare research analyst. He joined Pequot Capital Management in 1997 as a senior healthcare analyst before joining Columbus Circle Investors in 1999. At Pequot, Marti trained under the tutelage of Teena Lerner, a PhD in Molecular Biology and #1 ranked Institutional Investor biotech analyst, who started the Pequot Healthcare Fund, as well as with Pequot founders Arthur J. Samberg and Dan Benton.

In 2001, with his and CCI partner money, Marti established CCI's healthcare hedge fund unit CCI Healthcare which, along with a team of analysts led by Marti, invested in healthcare equities across sectors. The unit generated one of the industry's longest-running healthcare investment track records, with annualized net returns of 8% and 20% for its two funds, before returning investor capital at the end of 2017 when parent CCI exited the hedge fund business. He founded the healthcare-focused hedge fund Akera Capital, LLC in 2018.

Marti has spoken on healthcare investing on television and at numerous conferences, and has written on various topics, including how the growth in ETFs has distorted pricing in healthcare securities and how fundamental managers should react.
