= High Point Panthers men's lacrosse =

College lacrosse team in North Carolina, US

High Point Panthers men’s lacrosse
- Founded: 2010
- University: High Point University
- Head coach: John Crawley (since 2025 season)
- Stadium: Vert Stadium (capacity: 1,100 chair, 3,000 total)
- Location: High Point, North Carolina
- Conference: Big South Conference
- Nickname: Panthers

NCAA Tournament appearances
- 2015, 2021

Conference Tournament championships
- 2015, 2021

The High Point Panthers men's lacrosse team is a college lacrosse team that represents High Point University in High Point, North Carolina, United States. The school's teams are typically members of the Big South Conference, but due to the Big South not sponsoring Men's lacrosse, the HPU men's lacrosse team has had to play as associate members of other conferences. It had played in the Atlantic Sun Conference, now known as the ASUN Conference, in the 2014 season, moving to the Southern Conference (SoCon) after that season when the SoCon took over operation of the ASUN men's lacrosse league. The Panthers remained in SoCon men's lacrosse through the 2022 season, after which they moved men's lacrosse to the newly established league of the Atlantic 10 Conference (A-10).

The High Point University Athletics department announced the school was adding men's lacrosse as its 16th varsity sport on September 17, 2010. Two months later, Jon Torpey was announced as the first head coach in program history.

John Crawley was announced as the program's second head coach on June 14, 2024.

== History ==
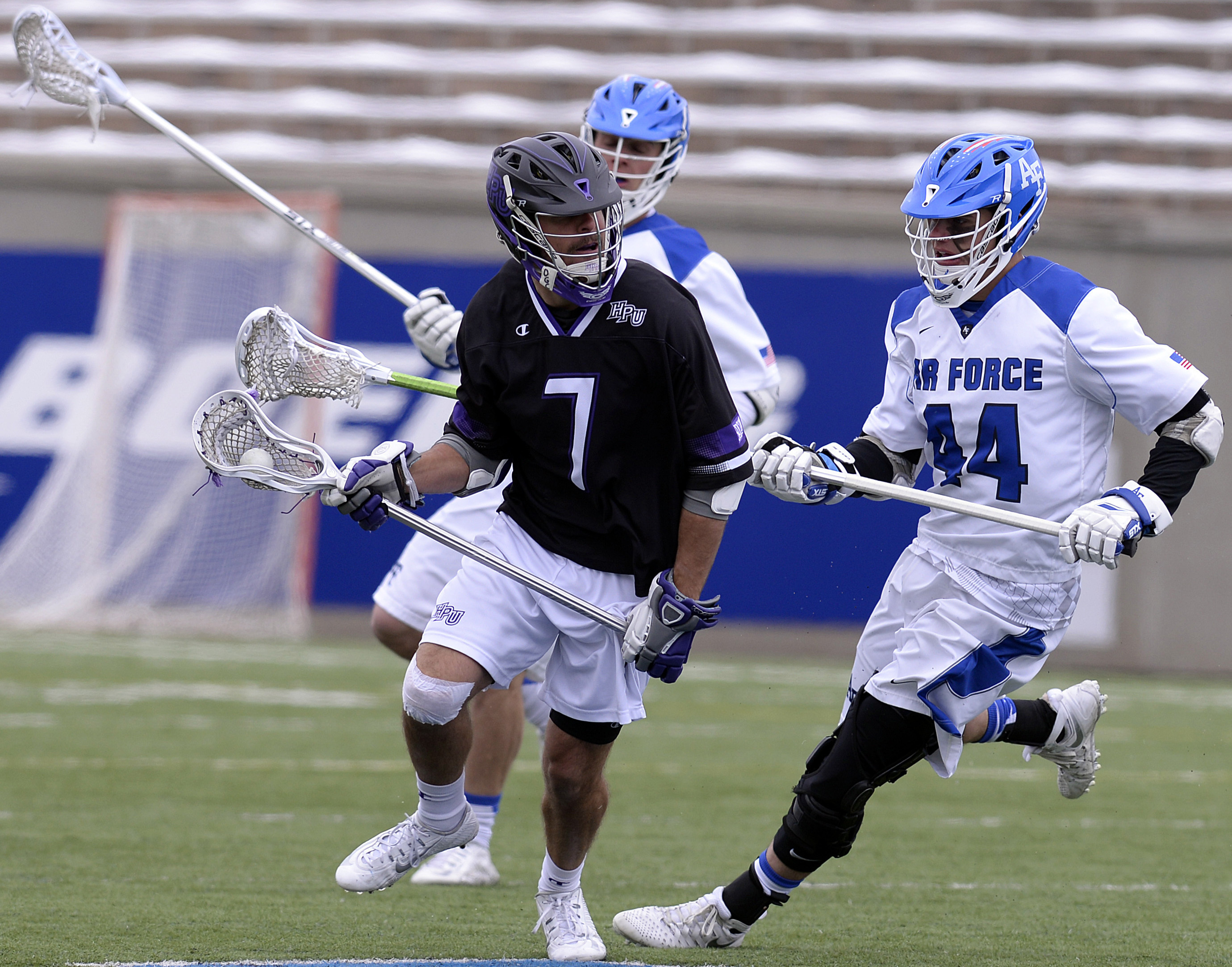
A lacrosse game between High Point and Air Force in 2016

=== Conference affiliations ===
- Independent (2013)
- Atlantic Sun (2014)
- SoCon (2015–2022)
- A-10 (2023–present)

=== Year by year results ===
Season	Coach	Overall	Conference	Standing	Postseason
2013	Jon Torpey	3–12			
2014	Jon Torpey	9–7	4–1	T-1st	
2015	Jon Torpey	10–7	4–2	T-2nd	NCAA Division I Play In
2016	Jon Torpey	9–6	5–2	3rd	
2017	Jon Torpey	4–10	2–5	T-6th	
2018	Jon Torpey	6–8	6–1	T-1st	
2019	Jon Torpey	13–3	6–1	T-1st	
2020	Jon Torpey	2–6		†	†
2021	Jon Torpey	8–6	4–1	T-1st	NCAA Division I First Round
2022	Jon Torpey	7–8	2–3	T-3rd	
2023	Jon Torpey	9–5	2–3	4th	
2024	Jon Torpey	9–7	3–2	3rd	
Jon Torpey:		89–85 (.511)	38–21 (.644)		
2025	John Crawley	7–9	3–2	2nd	
2026	John Crawley	6–7	5–1	2nd	
John Crawley:		13–16 (.448)	8–3 (.727)		
Total:		102–101 (.502)			
National champion Postseason invitational champion Conference regular season champion Conference regular season and conference tournament champion Division regular season champion Division regular season and conference tournament champion Conference tournament champion

=== All-time coaching records ===
Head coach	Years	Win–loss–tie	Pct.
Jon Torpey	2013–2024	89–85	.511
John Crawley	2025–present	13–16	.448
