= Atlantic 10 Conference =

Collegiate athletic conference

- Formerly: Eastern Collegiate Basketball League (1976–77); Eastern Athletic Association (1977–82); Eastern 8 (unofficial, 1976–82)
- Association: NCAA
- Founded: 1976; 50 years ago
- Commissioner: Dan Leibovitz
- Sports fielded: 22; men's: 10; women's: 12
- Division: Division I
- Subdivision: non-football
- No. of teams: 14
- Headquarters: Washington, D.C., U.S.
- Region: Eastern United States; Midwestern United States
- Broadcasters: ESPN; CBS/CBSSN; USA Sports
- Website: atlantic10.com

Locations

The Atlantic 10 Conference (A-10) is a collegiate athletic conference whose schools compete in the National Collegiate Athletic Association's (NCAA) Division I. The A-10's member schools are located mostly on the East Coast and Midwest of the United States: Illinois, Missouri, New York, North Carolina, Ohio, Pennsylvania, Rhode Island, Virginia, and Washington, D.C.

Although some of its members are state-funded, half of its membership is made up of private, Catholic institutions. Despite the name, there are 14 full-time members in the conference; three affiliate members participate in women's field hockey and men's lacrosse.

The conference's commissioner since 2008 is Bernadette McGlade. McGlade will retire at the conclusion of the 2025–26 academic year; her replacement will be Dan Leibovitz, who joins the league having most recently been the senior men's basketball administrator for the Big East Conference. In fall 2023 the A-10 moved its headquarters from Newport News, Virginia, to Washington, D.C.

== History ==
Atlantic 10 Conference
Locations of A-10 members Full member Associate member

=== Early history ===
The Atlantic 10 Conference was founded in 1975 as the Eastern Collegiate Basketball League (ECBL) and began conference play in 1976. At that time, basketball was its only sport. After its first season, it added sports other than basketball and changed its name to the Eastern Athletic Association. However, despite its official names, it was popularly known as the Eastern 8, as it then had eight members (Villanova, Duquesne, Penn State, West Virginia, George Washington, Massachusetts, Pittsburgh, and Rutgers).

After changes in membership that saw charter members Villanova and Pittsburgh leave (in 1980 and 1982, respectively) and new members St. Bonaventure (1979), Rhode Island (1980), Saint Joseph's (1982), and Temple (1982) enter, establishing the league with 10 members, the conference adopted the current Atlantic 10 name in 1982.

=== Expansion, contraction, and football ===
Further membership changes saw the league expand to its maximum of 16 members. From 1997 through 2006, the league also operated a football conference; during that period, more than 20 schools were participating in A-10 competition in at least one sport. This ended when the A-10 football programs all departed to join a new football conference sponsored by the Colonial Athletic Association (CAA; now known as the Coastal Athletic Association). In 2012, Butler joined the conference after leaving the Horizon League and VCU joined after leaving the CAA.

=== Conference realignments and expanding media presence ===
Conference realignment in 2013 saw the departure of Temple to the American Athletic Conference, Butler and Xavier to the reconfigured Big East, and Charlotte to Conference USA. George Mason joined from the CAA, and Davidson from the Southern Conference announced it would join in 2014.

The league headquarters is located in Washington, DC. In the Fall of 2023 they relocated the HQ from Newport News, Virginia where it had been located since fall 2009. Prior to that, the headquarters was in Philadelphia, within a few miles of member schools Saint Joseph's and La Salle.

The conference currently has media deals with ESPN, CBS Sports Network, NBC Sports, and digital broadcasts with ESPN+.

On November 16, 2021, Loyola University Chicago announced that its athletic program - the Loyola Ramblers - would leave the Missouri Valley Conference and join the A-10 effective July 1, 2022. On May 23, 2022, the addition of men's lacrosse was announced for the 2023 season. The four full members that sponsor the sport (Richmond, St. Bonaventure, Saint Joseph's, UMass) were joined by new affiliate members High Point and Hobart.

On December 14, 2023, the conference announced a five-year media deal with its current affiliates, ESPN, CBS, and NBC. The deal would expand basketball coverage and revenue for the schools. The first year of the new contract is the 2024–2025 season and runs through the 2028–29 season.

In late February 2024, it was announced that the 2024–25 season for UMass sports will be the last season as members of the Atlantic 10. The Minutemen will rejoin the Mid-American Conference (MAC) as a full member beginning in 2025.

== Member schools ==
=== Current members ===
==== Full members ====
The following is a list of the full members of the conference and the year they joined:

Institution	Location	Founded	Type	Enrollment	Endowment (millions)	Nickname	Joined (Note: Represents the calendar year when fall sports competition begins.)	Colors
Davidson College	Davidson, North Carolina	1837	Presbyterian (PCUSA)	1,843	$1,300	Wildcats	2014	
University of Dayton	Dayton, Ohio	1850	Catholic (Marianists)	11,241	$770	Flyers	1995	
Duquesne University	Pittsburgh, Pennsylvania	1878	Catholic (Spiritans)	9,274	$472.1	Dukes	1976 (Note: Duquesne left the A-10 for the Midwestern Collegiate Conference (MCC, now known as the Horizon League) only for the 1992–93 school year, but returned to the A-10 in 1993–94.)	
Duquesne University	Pittsburgh, Pennsylvania	1878	Catholic (Spiritans)	9,274	$472.1	Dukes	1993	
Fordham University	Bronx, New York	1841	Catholic (Jesuit)	16,515	$972	Rams	1995	
George Mason University	Fairfax, Virginia (Note: While the main campus has a Fairfax mailing address, it is located in an area of unincorporated Fairfax County designated by the US Census Bureau as George Mason, Virginia.)	1957	Public	35,047	$222.2	Patriots	2013	
George Washington University	Washington, D.C.	1821	Nonsectarian	28,172	$2,400	Revolutionaries	1976	
La Salle University	Philadelphia, Pennsylvania	1863	Catholic (De La Salle; Brothers)	5,191	$80	Explorers	1995	
Loyola University Chicago	Chicago, Illinois	1870	Catholic (Jesuit)	16,437	$1,072	Ramblers	2022	
University of Rhode Island (Note: Massachusetts (UMass), Rhode Island and Richmond also played football within the A-10 from the 1997 to the 2006 fall seasons (1997–98 to 2006–07 school years) after the Yankee Conference was absorbed. However, Richmond's primary conference until the 2000-01 school year was the Colonial Athletic Association (CAA).)	Kingston, Rhode Island	1892	Public	16,883	$278.7	Rams	1980	
University of Richmond	Richmond, Virginia	1840	Nonsectarian	4,002	$3,100	Spiders	2001	
St. Bonaventure University	St. Bonaventure, New York	1858	Catholic (Franciscan)	2,381	$92.3	Bonnies	1979	
Saint Joseph's University	Philadelphia, Pennsylvania	1851	Catholic (Jesuit)	7,589	$378.8	Hawks	1982	
Saint Louis University	St. Louis, Missouri	1818	Catholic (Jesuit)	12,883	$1,700	Billikens	2005	
Virginia Commonwealth University (VCU)	Richmond, Virginia	1838	Public	31,076	$2,720	Rams	2012	

==== Associate members ====
The "joined" column indicates the calendar year in which each school became an A-10 associate, which for spring sports such as lacrosse is the year before the first season of competition.

Institution	Location	Founded	Type	Enrollment	Nickname	Joined (Note: Represents the calendar year when fall sports competition begins.)	A-10 sport(s)	Primary conference
University of Delaware	Newark, Delaware	1743	Public (Note: Delaware is officially chartered as a "privately-governed, state-assisted" institution. This status is broadly similar to that of New York State's statutory colleges, most of which are housed at Cornell University, or institutions in Pennsylvania's Commonwealth System of Higher Education.)	23,774	Blue Hens	2025	Men's lacrosse	Conf. USA (CUSA)
High Point University	High Point, North Carolina	1924	United; Methodist	4,545	Panthers	2022	Men's lacrosse	Big South (BSC)
Hobart College	Geneva, New York	1822	Nonsectarian	2,105	Statesmen	2022	Men's lacrosse	Liberty (LL) (Note: Currently an NCAA Division III athletic conference.)
Lock Haven University of Pennsylvania	Lock Haven, Pennsylvania	1870	Public (Note: Part of the Pennsylvania State System of Higher Education System (PASSHE).)	3,425	Bald Eagles	2010	Field hockey	Pennsylvania (PSAC) (Note: Currently an NCAA Division II athletic conference.)
University of Massachusetts Amherst (Note: Massachusetts (UMass) was a full member of the A-10 from 1976–77 to 2024–25.) (UMass)	Amherst, Massachusetts	1863	Public (Note: Part of the University of Massachusetts (UMass) System.)	30,593	Minutemen	2025 (Note: Measured from UMass' departure from full A-10 membership.)	Men's lacrosse	Mid-American (MAC)

=== Former members ===
==== Former full members ====
None of these institutions played football in the A-10 during their tenure as full members.

Institution	Location	Founded	Type	Enrollment	Nickname	Joined (Note: Represents the calendar year when fall sports competition begins.)	Left (Note: Represents the calendar year when spring sports competition ends.)	Subsequent conference	Current conference
Butler University	Indianapolis, Indiana	1855	Nonsectarian (Note: Historically affiliated with the Christian Church (Disciples of Christ).)	4,667	Bulldogs	2012	2013	Big East	
University of North Carolina at Charlotte (UNC Charlotte, Charlotte)	Charlotte, North Carolina	1946	Public	26,232	49ers	2005	2013	Conf. USA (CUSA)	American
University of Massachusetts Amherst (Note: Massachusetts (UMass) remains in the A-10 as an associate member for men's lacrosse.) (UMass)	Amherst, Massachusetts	1863	Public	30,593	Minutemen & Minutewomen	1976	2025	Mid-American (MAC)	
Pennsylvania State University (Penn State)	University Park, Pennsylvania	1855	Public	45,351	Nittany; Lions	1976	1979	Big Ten (B1G)	
Pennsylvania State University (Penn State)	University Park, Pennsylvania	1855	Public	45,351	Nittany; Lions	1982	1991	Big Ten (B1G)	
University of Pittsburgh (Pitt)	Pittsburgh, Pennsylvania	1787	Public	28,766	Panthers	1976	1982	Big East	Atlantic Coast (ACC)
Rutgers University	New Brunswick, New Jersey	1766	Public	58,788	Scarlet; Knights	1976	1995	Big East/American (Note: Rutgers spent one season in the renamed American Athletic Conference before joining the Big Ten in the 2014–15 school year.)	Big Ten (B1G)
Temple University	Philadelphia, Pennsylvania	1884	Public	38,648	Owls	1982	2013	American	
Villanova University	Villanova, Pennsylvania	1842	Catholic (Augustinian)	10,482	Wildcats	1976	1980	Big East	Big East
Virginia Polytechnic Institute and State University (Virginia Tech)	Blacksburg, Virginia	1872	Public	31,087	Hokies	1995	2000	Big East	Atlantic Coast (ACC)
West Virginia University	Morgantown, West Virginia	1867	Public	29,707	Mountaineers	1976	1995	Big East	Big 12
Xavier University	Cincinnati, Ohio	1831	Catholic (Jesuit)	6,650	Musketeers	1995	2013	Big East	

==== Former associate members ====
Institution	Location	Founded	Type	Enrollment	Nickname	Joined (Note: Represents the calendar year when fall sports competition begins.)	Left (Note: Represents the calendar year when spring sports competition ends.)	A-10 sport(s)	Primary conference
Saint Francis University	Loretto, Pennsylvania	1847	Catholic (Franciscan)	2,449	Red Flash	2013	2020	Field hockey	Northeast (NEC) (Presidents' (PAC) (Note: Currently an NCAA Division III athletic conference.) in 2026)
West Chester University	West Chester, Pennsylvania	1880	Public (Note: Part of the Pennsylvania State System of Higher Education System (PASSHE).)	13,271 (Note: Full-time enrollment.)	Golden Rams	1996	2011	Field hockey	Pennsylvania (PSAC) (Note: Currently an NCAA Division II athletic conference.)
West Chester University	West Chester, Pennsylvania	1880	Public	2,576 (Note: Part-time enrollment.)	Golden Rams	1996	2011	Field hockey	Pennsylvania (PSAC)

==== Former football-only members ====
After expansion in the Colonial Athletic Association brought that conference to 6 football-playing schools, it was agreed that the CAA would take over management of the Atlantic 10's football conference starting in the 2007–08 school year as the legally separate entity of CAA Football. All the schools on this list (except Boston U. and Connecticut) were in the A-10 football conference when it became CAA Football, but Hofstra and Northeastern discontinued their football programs after the 2009–10 school year. Membership dates include time in the Yankee Conference (which was an all-sports conference from the 1947–48 to 1975–76 seasons, and a football-only conference after that) which merged into the A-10 in the 1997–98 school year.

Institution	Location	Founded	Type	Nickname	Joined (Note: Represents the calendar year when fall sports competition begins.)	Left (Note: Represents the calendar year when spring sports competition ends.)	Primary conference(s) at the time of their tenure	Current primary conference
Boston University	Boston, Massachusetts	1839	Nonsectarian (Note: Historically affiliated with the United Methodist Church.)	Terriers	1973	1998 (Note: Boston University dropped football after the 1997 fall season (1997–98 school year).)	Independent (1976–79); America East (1979–2013)	Patriot League (2013–present)
University of Connecticut	Storrs, Connecticut	1881	Public	Huskies	1947	2000 (Note: UConn moved to FBS after the 1999 fall season (1999–2000 school year), and eventually joined the Big East for that sport in the 2004 fall season (2004–05 school year).)	Independent (1976–79); Big East (1979–2013); American (2013–20)	Big East (2020–present)
University of Delaware	Newark, Delaware	1743	Public	Fightin'; Blue Hens	1986	2007	East Coast (1958–91); America East (1991–2001); CAA (2001–25)	CUSA (2025–present)
Hofstra University	Hempstead, New York	1935	Nonsectarian	Pride	2001	2007 (Note: Hofstra dropped football after the 2009 fall season (2009–10 school year).)	CAA (2001–present)	
James Madison University	Harrisonburg, Virginia	1908	Public	Dukes	1993	2007	CAA (1979–2022)	Sun Belt (2022–present)
University of Maine	Orono, Maine	1865	Public	Black Bears	1947	2007	Independent (1976–79)	America East (1979–present)
University of New Hampshire	Durham, New Hampshire	1866	Public	Wildcats	1947	2007	Independent (1976–79)	America East (1979–present)
Northeastern University	Boston, Massachusetts	1898	Nonsectarian	Huskies	1993	2007 (Note: Northeastern dropped football after the 2009 fall season (2009–10 school year).)	America East (1979–2005)	CAA (2005–present)
Towson University	Towson, Maryland	1866	Public	Tigers	2004	2007	CAA (1979–82); East Coast (1982–92); Big South (1992–95); America East (1995–2001)	CAA (2001–present)
Villanova University (Note: Villanova was originally a charter and full member of the A-10 from 1976–77 to 1979–80 in all sports except football.)	Villanova, Pennsylvania	1842	Catholic (Augustinian)	Wildcats	1988	2007	Big East (1980–2013)	Big East (2013–present)
The College of William & Mary	Williamsburg, Virginia	1693	Public	Tribe	1993	2007	CAA (1979–present)	

=== Membership timeline ===
Full member (all sports) Full member (non-football) Associate member (football) Associate member (sport) Other Conference Other Conference
Notes
^{*} - Virginia Tech did not participate in wrestling.

== Atlantic 10 rivalries ==
There are a number of intense rivalries within the Atlantic 10, with rivalries that carry over from the Big 5 which includes Saint Joseph's, La Salle, and Temple (now in the American Conference). URI and UMass also have a long-standing rivalry. St. Bonaventure and Duquesne also maintain a rivalry that predates their affiliation with the conference. UMass and Temple also had a basketball rivalry while John Chaney was coaching Temple but it has died down a bit since, and even more so now that Temple has left the conference. The long-standing crosstown rivalry between Richmond and VCU, now known as the Capital City Classic, became a conference rivalry with VCU's arrival in the A10. Rivals St. Louis and Dayton play each year in basketball for the Arch-Baron Cup. George Washington and George Mason compete annually in the Revolutionary Rivalry across all sports.

== Sports ==
In the 2021–22 academic year, the Atlantic 10 Conference sponsors championship competition in ten men's and thirteen women's NCAA sanctioned sports, with lacrosse becoming the 10th sponsored men's sport in 2022–23 and women's golf becoming the 13th sponsored women's sport in 2024–25. In addition to the 15 full members, Lock Haven and Saint Francis is an affiliate member in field hockey. High Point and Hobart became men's lacrosse affiliates in July 2022. Delaware joined as a men's lacrosse affiliate on July 1, 2025, coinciding with its move to Conference USA, and UMass began competing as a men's lacrosse affiliate when the majority of its sports joined the Mid-American Conference on July 1, 2025.

A-10 Conference teams
Sport	Men's	Women's
Baseball	12	–
Basketball	14	14
Cross country	14	14
Field hockey	–	7
Golf	11	7
Lacrosse	7	10
Rowing	–	8
Soccer	13	14
Softball	–	9
Swimming & Diving	7	10
Tennis	9	11
Track and Field (Indoor)	9	13
Track and Field (Outdoor)	11.5	13.5
Volleyball	–	10

=== Men's sponsored sports by school ===
School	Baseball	Basketball	Cross Country	Golf	Lacrosse	Soccer	Swimming & Diving	Tennis	Track & Field (Indoor)	Track & Field (Outdoor)	Total A-10 Sports
Davidson	Yes	Yes	Yes	Yes	No	Yes	Yes	Yes	Yes	Yes	9
Dayton	Yes	Yes	Yes	Yes	No	Yes	No	Yes	No	No	6
Duquesne	No	Yes	Yes	No	No	Yes	No	Yes	No	Yes	5
Fordham	Yes	Yes	Yes	Yes	No	Yes	Yes	Yes	Yes	Yes	9
George Mason	Yes	Yes	Yes	Yes	No	Yes	Yes	Yes	Yes	Yes	9
George Washington	Yes	Yes	Yes	Yes	No	Yes	Yes	No	No	Yes	7
La Salle	Yes	Yes	Yes	Yes	No	Yes	Yes	No	Yes	Yes	8
Loyola Chicago	No	Yes	Yes	Yes	No	Yes	No	No	Yes	Yes	6
Rhode Island	Yes	Yes	Yes	Yes	No	Yes	No	No	Yes	Yes	7
Richmond	Yes	Yes	Yes	Yes	Yes	No	No	Yes	No	No	6
St. Bonaventure	Yes	Yes	Yes	Yes	Yes	Yes	Yes	Yes	No	Yes (Note: St. Bonaventure sponsors an outdoor distance track program but does not participate in short distance or field events.)	8.5
Saint Joseph's	Yes	Yes	Yes	Yes	Yes	Yes	No	Yes	Yes	Yes	9
Saint Louis	Yes	Yes	Yes	No	No	Yes	Yes	No	Yes	Yes	7
VCU	Yes	Yes	Yes	Yes	No	Yes	No	Yes	Yes	Yes	8
Associate Members
Delaware					Yes						1
High Point					Yes						1
Hobart					Yes						1
Massachusetts					Yes						1
Totals	12	14	14	11	3+4	13	7	9	9	11.5	103.5+4

Notes

Men's varsity sports not sponsored by the Atlantic 10 Conference which are played by A-10 schools

School	Football	Rowing (Note: Men's varsity rowing is sanctioned by the Intercollegiate Rowing Association, not by the NCAA.)	Sailing (Note: Intercollegiate sailing is sanctioned by the Inter-Collegiate Sailing Association, not by the NCAA.)	Squash (Note: Squash is sanctioned by the College Squash Association (CSA), not by the NCAA.)	Volleyball	Water polo	Wrestling
Davidson	Pioneer	No	SAISA	No	No	No	SoCon
Dayton	Pioneer	No	No	No	No	No	No
Duquesne	Northeast	No	No	No	No	No	No
Fordham	Patriot	No (Note: Fordham competes in men's rowing as a club sport in the American Collegiate Rowing Association.)	MAISA	LL	No	CWPA N	No
George Mason	No	No	No	No	EIVA	No	MAC
George Washington	No	No	No	No	No	CWPA SE	No
La Salle	No	IRA	No	No	No	No	No
Loyola Chicago	No	No	No	No	MIVA	No	No
Rhode Island	CAA Football	No	NEISA	No	No	No	No
Richmond	Patriot	No	No	No	No	No	No
St. Bonaventure	No	No	No	No	No	No	No
Saint Joseph's	No	IRA	No	No	No	No	No

=== Women's sponsored sports by school ===
School	Basketball	Cross Country	Field Hockey	Golf	Lacrosse	Rowing	Soccer	Softball	Swimming & Diving	Tennis	Track & Field (Indoor)	Track & Field (Outdoor)	Volleyball	Total A-10 Sports
Davidson	Yes	Yes	Yes	No	Yes	No	Yes	No	Yes	Yes	Yes	Yes	Yes	10
Dayton	Yes	Yes	No	Yes	No	Yes	Yes	Yes	No	Yes	Yes	Yes	Yes	10
Duquesne	Yes	Yes	No	Yes	Yes	Yes	Yes	No	Yes	Yes	Yes	Yes	Yes	11
Fordham	Yes	Yes	No	No	No	Yes	Yes	Yes	Yes	Yes	Yes	Yes	Yes	10
George Mason	Yes	Yes	No	No	Yes	Yes	Yes	Yes	Yes	Yes	Yes	Yes	Yes	11
George Washington	Yes	Yes	No	No	Yes	Yes	Yes	Yes	Yes	Yes	Yes	Yes	Yes	11
La Salle	Yes	Yes	Yes	Yes	Yes	Yes	Yes	No	Yes	No	Yes	Yes	No	10
Loyola Chicago	Yes	Yes	No	Yes	No	No	Yes	Yes	No	No	Yes	Yes	Yes	7
Rhode Island	Yes	Yes	No	No	Yes	Yes	Yes	Yes	Yes	Yes	Yes	Yes	Yes	11
Richmond	Yes	Yes	Yes	Yes	Yes	No	Yes	No	Yes	Yes	Yes	Yes	No	10
St. Bonaventure	Yes	Yes	No	Yes	Yes	No	Yes	Yes	Yes	Yes	No	Yes (Note: St. Bonaventure sponsors an outdoor distance track program but does not participate in short distance or field events.)	No	8.5
Saint Joseph's	Yes	Yes	Yes	Yes	Yes	Yes	Yes	Yes	No	Yes	Yes	Yes	No	11
Saint Louis	Yes	Yes	Yes	No	No	No	Yes	Yes	Yes	No	Yes	Yes	Yes	9
VCU	Yes	Yes	Yes	No	Yes	No	Yes	No	No	Yes	Yes	Yes	Yes	9
Associate Members
Lock Haven			Yes											1
Totals	14	14	6+1	7	10	8	14	9	10	11	13	13.5	10	138.5+1

Notes

Women's varsity sports not sponsored by the Atlantic 10 Conference which are played by A-10 schools

School	Acrobatics & tumbling (Note: Graduated from the NCAA Emerging Sports for Women program to full championship status in January 2026, with the first official NCAA championship to take place in 2026–27.)	Bowling	Gymnastics	Rugby (Note: Part of the NCAA Emerging Sports for Women program.)	Sailing (Note: Intercollegiate sailing is sanctioned by the Inter-Collegiate Sailing Association, not by the NCAA.)	Squash (Note: Squash is sanctioned by the College Squash Association (CSA), not by the NCAA.)	Triathlon	Water polo
Davidson	No	No	No	No	SAISA	No	No	No
Duquesne	Independent	Northeast	No	No	No	No	Independent	No
Fordham	No	No	No	No	MAISA	No	No	No
George Washington	No	No	EAGL	No	MAISA	CSA	No	No
La Salle	Independent	No	No	Independent	No	No	Independent	Metro

=== Current tournament champions ===
The Atlantic 10 Conference sponsors championship competition in 10 men's and 12 women's NCAA sanctioned sport.

Regular-season champions are indicated with "(RS)" and tournament champions with "(T)".

Season	Sport	Men's champion	Women's champion
Fall 2025	Cross country	Loyola	Loyola
Fall 2025	Field hockey		Richmond & VCU (RS); Saint Joseph's (T)
Fall 2025	Soccer	Saint Louis (RS & T)	Dayton (RS & T)
Fall 2025	Volleyball		Dayton (RS); Loyola (T)
Winter 2025–26	Basketball	VCU (RS & T)	George Mason (RS); Rhode Island (RS & T)
Winter 2025–26	Swimming & Diving	George Washington	Richmond
Winter 2025–26	Track & field (Indoor)	Rhode Island	VCU
Spring 2026	Golf	Richmond	Richmond
Spring 2026	Tennis	Richmond	VCU
Spring 2026	Lacrosse	Richmond (RS & T)	Richmond (RS); Davidson (T)
Spring 2026	Baseball	Saint Joseph's (RS); VCU (T)	
Spring 2026	Softball		Loyola (RS); Fordham (T)
Spring 2026	Rowing		Rhode Island
Spring 2026	Track & field (Outdoor)	Rhode Island	Dayton

== Football (1997–2006) ==
=== Origin ===
The A-10 began sponsoring football in 1997 when it absorbed the Yankee Conference, a Division I-AA (now known as Division I FCS) football-only conference. The move was triggered by a change in NCAA rules that reduced the influence of single-sport conferences over NCAA legislation. The following teams were in the Yankee Conference at the time of its demise:

- Boston University Terriers football
- Connecticut Huskies football
- Delaware Fightin' Blue Hens football
- James Madison Dukes football
- Maine Black Bears football
- UMass Minutemen football
- New Hampshire Wildcats football
- Northeastern Huskies football
- Rhode Island Rams football
- Richmond Spiders football
- Villanova Wildcats football
- William & Mary Tribe football

Boston University dropped football after the first season of A-10 football. After the 1999 season, UConn started a transition from Division I-AA to Division I-A football (now Division I FBS) that was completed in 2002. In 2004, UConn, already a member of the Big East for other sports, became a football member of that conference. The other schools all remained in the A-10 football conference until the management change after the 2006 season.

=== Football champions ===
Season	Regular season champion
1997	Villanova
1998	Richmond
1999	James Madison, Massachusetts
2000	Delaware, Richmond
2001	Hofstra, Maine, Villanova, William & Mary
2002	Maine, Northeastern
2003	Delaware, Massachusetts
2004	Delaware, James Madison, William & Mary
2005	New Hampshire, Richmond
2006	Massachusetts

=== Demise/"rename" ===
The 2005 move of Northeastern University, a football-only member of the A-10, to the Colonial Athletic Association for basketball and Olympic sports began a chain of events that would lead to the demise of the A-10 football conference, at least under the A-10 banner.

At that time, the CAA did not sponsor football, but five of its members in the 2004–05 academic year (Delaware, Hofstra, James Madison, Towson, and William & Mary) were football members of the A-10. The addition of Northeastern gave the CAA six schools with football programs, which under NCAA rules allows a conference to sponsor football. Northeastern agreed to join any future CAA football conference, which meant that the A-10 football conference would drop to six members once CAA football began operation.

With six football members in place, the CAA decided to start a football conference in 2007. The league then invited Richmond, a member of the CAA from 1983 to 2001, to rejoin for football only, because of UR's long-standing in-state rivalries with William & Mary and James Madison. UR accepted the invitation, taking the A-10 football conference below the NCAA minimum of six. Shortly after this, the A-10 football conference opted to disband, with all of its members becoming charter members of the CAA football conference. This league continues to operate under the administration of the multi-sports CAA, now known as the Coastal Athletic Association, as the legally separate entity of CAA Football (in full, the Coastal Athletic Association Football Conference).

=== A-10 schools in DI-A/FBS ===
A-10 charter members Penn State, Pittsburgh, Rutgers, West Virginia, and Villanova played I-A football as independents while members of the A-10 in other sports. Villanova became a member of the Big East in 1980 with Pittsburgh following in 1982. Temple joined the A-10 that year. Penn State joined the Big Ten in 1991 (effectively in 1993), and three A-10 members joined the Big East as football-only members: Rutgers, West Virginia, and Temple (only Rutgers and West Virginia would later join the Big East as full members in 1995).

Virginia Tech joined the A-10 in 1995 as a result of the merger that created Conference USA. They would then join the Big East as full members in 2000, following the football program which was already a member of the league. Temple remained a football-only member of the Big East until 2004; they would join the MAC for football in 2007 until 2012, and re-joined the Big East in football for the 2012 season. Temple planned to move the rest of its sports into the Big East in 2013, but the conference realigned into the football-sponsoring American Athletic Conference, now known as the American Conference, and a new non-football Big East. Temple joined the American. Massachusetts joined them in FBS football with membership in the MAC beginning in the 2012 season and as an FBS independent beginning in 2016, remaining as such until returning to the MAC in 2025 as a full member. Charlotte, which started a football program in 2013, left for Conference USA and eventually joined the American in 2023.

A-10 schools in DI-A/FBS
Schools currently in the A-10	Schools formerly in the A-10
N/A	Penn State
N/A	Pittsburgh
N/A	Rutgers
N/A	Temple
N/A	Virginia Tech
N/A	West Virginia
N/A	Charlotte
N/A	Massachusetts

== Facilities ==
School	Basketball arena	Capacity	Baseball stadium	Capacity	Soccer stadium	Capacity
Davidson	John M. Belk Arena	5,223	T. Henry Wilson, Jr. Field	700	1992 Team Field at Alumni Stadium	2,000
Dayton	University of Dayton Arena	13,435	Woerner Field	500	Baujan Field	2,000
Duquesne	UPMC Cooper Fieldhouse	3,500	Non-baseball school		Rooney Field	2,200
Fordham	Rose Hill Gymnasium	3,200	Houlihan Park	500	Coffey Field	7,000
George Mason	EagleBank Arena	10,000	Spuhler Field	900	George Mason Stadium	5,000
George Washington	Smith Center	4,338	Barcroft Park	1,000	Mount Vernon Athletic Fields	—N/a
La Salle	John Glaser Arena	3,400	Hank DeVincent Field	1,000	McCarthy Stadium	7,500
Loyola Chicago	Joseph J. Gentile Arena	4,963	Non-baseball school		Loyola Soccer Park	1,000
Rhode Island	Ryan Center	8,000	Bill Beck Field	1,000	URI Soccer Complex	1,547
Richmond	Robins Center	7,201	Malcolm U. Pitt Field	600	Presidents Field	500
St. Bonaventure	Reilly Center	5,480	Fred Handler Park	—N/a	Marra Athletics Field	—N/a
Saint Joseph's	Hagan Arena	4,200	Smithson Field	400	Sweeney Field	3,000
Saint Louis	Chaifetz Arena	10,600	Billiken Sports Center	500	Hermann Stadium	6,050
VCU	Stuart C. Siegel Center	7,617	The Diamond	9,560	Sports Backers Stadium	3,250
