= Kevin Lowe (lacrosse) =

American lacrosse player

Personal information
- Nationality: American

Sport
- Position: Attack
- Shoots: Left
- NLL draft: 4th overall, 1994; New York Saints
- NLL teams: New York Saints (1995, 1996, 2000, 2001)
- MLL teams: Long Island Lizards (2003–2004); Philadelphia Barrage (2006)
- NCAA team Former teams: Princeton University; Long Island- Hofstra lacrosse club
- Pro career: 1995–2006

Career highlights
- College highlights: Jack Turnbull Award (1994); Men's Ivy League Player of the Year (1994); All-American 3x (1st team: 1994; 2nd team: 1992 & 1993); NCAA Men's Lacrosse Championship (1992, 1994); Records: Princeton career points (247, 1994–present); Princeton career assists (174, 1994–present); Princeton single-season points (69, 1994–96); Princeton single-season assists (43, 1991–93, 47 1993–97); Princeton single-game assists (9, 1991–present); Princeton consecutive games with a point (60, 1994–present); Ivy League career assists (former recordholder); Professional highlights: Major League Lacrosse Steinfeld Cup Champion (2003); Major League Lacrosse Championship MVP (2003)
Medal record
Representing United States
Lacrosse
World Lacrosse Championship
Gold medal – first place	2002 Perth	Field lacrosse

Kevin E. Lowe is an American finance executive and retired professional lacrosse player who played professional box lacrosse in the National Lacrosse League and professional field lacrosse in Major League Lacrosse from 1995 to 2006.

He was as a member of the Princeton Tigers men's lacrosse team from 1991 through 1994 and was inducted into the Lacrosse Museum and National Hall of Fame in 2009, joining his brother and father. He was a high school and college lacrosse United States Intercollegiate Lacrosse Association (USILA) All-American. Lowe is the only player in lacrosse history to score an overtime goal in both an NCAA Men's Lacrosse Championship game and a Major League Lacrosse Steinfeld Cup championship game.

He holds numerous Princeton scoring records and formerly held the Ivy League single season assists record. As a college senior, he was honored as the National Collegiate Athletic Association's best lacrosse attackman and the Ivy League's best player. In his four-year college career, Princeton won its first two NCAA tournament Championship, two Ivy League Championships and earned four NCAA Men's Lacrosse Championship tournament invitations.

== Background ==
He is the brother of 1992 Division I Player of the Year and Hall of Famer Darren Lowe and the son of Hall of Famer Alan Lowe. Alan, who was the longtime Manhasset High School coach, had won both a World Lacrosse Championship and NCAA Men's Lacrosse Championship. Lowe was a high school All-American from Mineola, New York who received numerous prep accolades: National High School North/South Lacrosse All-Star Game (1990), Nassau County All-Star Game (1990) and Empire State Games (1989). Lowe is currently married with three children. As a youth he played soccer, the quarterback position in American football and the point guard position in basketball. He is currently a stockbroker on Wall Street.

== College career ==
Including the 2009 season, Lowe is among the all time college leaders in Total Assists with 174 assists. Lowe holds numerous Princeton University scoring records (career points, career assists, single-game assists, consecutive games with a point, and points by a freshman). He formerly held the school records for single-season points and single-season assists. Lowe formerly held the Ivy League career assists record. However, since the Ivy League uses conference games only, Ryan Boyle now holds the career assists record although Lowe holds the school record. Lowe is the only Tiger to have scored a point in all of Princeton's games during his career (Boyle scored in all games he played but missed 4 games). His final career goal clinched the 1994 NCAA Division I Men's Lacrosse Championship for the Tigers in overtime. Princeton was 52–8 during Lowe's career, including a 7–2 record in four NCAA tournaments. The 1992 and 1993 teams were undefeated 6–0 outright Ivy League champions,

As a freshman, on April 6, 1991, he led number three ranked Princeton to a 17–9 victory over Yale. It was Princeton's first victory over Yale since 1986. Lowe had nine assists, which set a school single-game record. As of 2010, this continues to be a Princeton single-game record. After the tenth game of the season, Lowe continued to lead the nation in assists. He was the leading scorer on Princeton's team that won the 1992 NCAA Division I Men's Lacrosse Championship to win its first NCAA tournament. As a senior in 1994, his 73 assists in league games broke his brother Darren's 1992 Ivy League single season record and earned him Ivy League Player of the Year honors. In the 1994 NCAA Division I Men's Lacrosse Championship game, he scored the game-winning goal in sudden death overtime against Virginia. After Princeton won the face-off, the goal came on the first shot on goal of overtime. When his collegiate eligibility ended, he had the four highest single-season assist totals in school history.

Lowe was the Jack Turnbull Award and Men's Ivy League Player of the Year Award winner for 1994. He was a first team USILA All-American Team selection in 1994 and a second team selection in 1992 and 1993. He was a four-time All-Ivy League selection and three-time first team All-Ivy League selection (1992, 1993, & 1994)

=== Princeton University ===
Season	GP	G	A	Pts	PPG
1991	15	13	43	56	3.9
1992	15	17	39	56	3.9
1993	15	19	47	66	4.4
1994	15	24	45	69	4.6
Totals	60	73	174	247	4.12

== Club Lacrosse Career ==
Kevin Lowe and his brother, Darren Lowe, played post-collegiate lacrosse for the Long Island-Hofstra lacrosse club. In 1996, they were members of the team that defeated Team Toyota in the USCLA Championship at Cabrini College. Team Toyota included Quint Kessenich, Gary Gait and Paul Gait.

== Professional career ==
Lowe played in the indoor National Lacrosse League from 1995 to 2001 and the outdoor Major League Lacrosse from 2003 to 2006. He played with the New York Saints of the NLL in 1995, 1996, 2000 and 2001. Then he played in the MLL with the Long Island Lizards in 2003 and 2004 and the Philadelphia Barrage in 2006. In 2003, he was selected to his first MLL All-Star Game, he was injured and instead served as an assistant coach during the game. He was leading the league in assists and had tied the league single-game assists record (6) prior to injury. He and his brother were teammates for the United States at the 2002 World Lacrosse Championship, where they won the championship. In the semifinal match against the Iroquois Nation, he scored four goals and had an assist. His overtime goal in the 2003 MLL Championship game earned the Long Island Lizards the Steinfeld Cup. It occurred only 22 seconds into the overtime period to give the Lizards the victory over the Baltimore Bayhawks whom they had met in each of the first three MLL championships. Lowe scored four goals and added an assist in the 15–14 victory to earn the MLL Championship MVP award. Lowe, who was second in the MLL with 20 assists, injured his knee during the 2004 season and missed the rest of the year.

=== NLL stats ===
The following are his NLL career stats:

		Regular Season
Season	Team	GP	G	A	Pts	LB	PIM
1995	New York	8	4	3	7	25	2
1996	New York	9	2	3	5	28	0
2000	New York	11	2	4	6	59	11
2001	New York	13	5	12	17	78	4
		41	13	22	35	190	17

=== MLL stats ===
The following are his MLL career stats:

		Regular Season							Playoffs
Season	Team	GP	G	2ptG	A	Pts	LB	PIM	GP	G	2ptG	A	Pts	LB	PIM
2003	Long Island	11	13	0	28	41	20	0.5	2	6	0	4	10	6	0
2004	Long Island	7	5	0	20	25	12	0.5
2006	Philadelphia	7	4	1	1	6	4	0
		25	22	1	49	72	36	1	2	6	0	4	10	6	0

Preceded by Matt Riter	Jack Turnbull Award; 1994	Succeeded by Terry Riordan
Preceded by Andy Towers	Ivy League Men's Lacrosse Player of the Year; 1994	Succeeded by David Evans
Preceded by Mark Millon	Major League Lacrosse Championship Game MVP; 2003	Succeeded by Greg Cattrano
