= Peter Baum =

American professional lacrosse player

Personal information
- Nationality: American
- Born: December 14, 1990 (age 35) Seattle, Washington, U.S.
- Height: 6 ft 1 in (185 cm)
- Weight: 185 lb (84 kg; 13 st 3 lb)

Sport
- Position: Attack, Midfield
- Shoots: Right
- PLL team: Redwoods Lacrosse Club
- NCAA team: Colgate University

Career highlights
- 2012 Division I Player of the Year; 1st Overall pick in the MLL Draft

Peter Baum (born December 14, 1990) is an American professional lacrosse player. He also played for Colgate University in Division I college lacrosse. He is a member of Redwoods Lacrosse Club of the Premier Lacrosse League.

== Early life ==
Born in Seattle, Washington, Baum is Jewish. He grew up in Portland, Oregon. He is the son of Richard L. Baum, a former Colgate alumnus and lacrosse player, and Jill Baum. He has a brother and a sister.

Baum started playing lacrosse at the age of 13. He attended Lincoln High School in Portland, Oregon, becoming a three-year letterman and three-time All-Conference. He was named a high school All-American and First Team All State in 2008 and 2009, and a 2009 Under Armour All-American.

== College career ==
Baum attended Colgate University as a geography major, and was a two-time All-American who played for the Raiders from 2010 to 2013.

In his freshman year in 2010, he was named All-Patriot League First Team, and was named Patriot League Rookie of the Week three times. In his sophomore year in 2011, Baum was again named All-Patriot League First Team, and was and named All-American honorable mention by the United States Intercollegiate Lacrosse Association, and named to the Academic All-Patriot League Team and the Patriot League Academic Honor Roll.

In 2012, Baum led the nation in scoring, with the highest point total since Matt Danowski in 2008. Baum scored 67 goals also in 2012, the sixth-highest single-season goal total in the NCAA record books. He led country with 5.39 points per game, and 3.72 goals per game, setting Patriot League records for season points and goals. Baum won the Tewaaraton Trophy as the Division I Player of the Year in 2012 (the first Colgate, Patriot League, and West Coast player to win the award), and won the Lt. Raymond J. Enners Award as the nation's top player, was named 2012 Patriot League Offensive Player of the Year, and was named to the 2012 USILA All-America First Team, the LaxPower All-America Team, the Patriot League First Team, the Patriot League All-Tournament Team, and the Academic All-Patriot League Team. He led his team to the NCAA tournament quarterfinals, as an unseeded team, the first-ever quarterfinals appearance for Colgate.

In 2013 as a senior Baum was team captain, All-Patriot League first team, and was chosen as All-America honorable mention and USILA Scholar All-American. He ended his career as the Patriot League's all-time leader in goals scored (164), the nation's active goal-scoring leader and hat-trick leader (34), and Colgate's all-time leader in goals and career points (225).

== Professional career ==
Baum was selected as the number one pick in the 2013 MLL Draft; however, in March 2013, Baum decided to sign with the LXM Pro Tour.

Playing in 2014 for the Ohio Machine, he was third in the Major League Lacrosse with 35 goals. He was an MLL All-Star for the Machine from 2014 to 2017, and tied for the most points in the MLL in 2017 with 52 points. He decided to attend law school after the summer of 2017.

Baum, who is Jewish and is thus eligible for Israeli citizenship under the country's Law of Return, was announced as a member of Israel's 150-man player pool.

In 2019, Baum joined Paul Rabil’s Premier Lacrosse League as a member of Redwoods Lacrosse Club.

== Statistics ==
=== Colgate University ===
Season	GP	G	A	Pts	PPG
2013	15	34	15	49	3.30
2012	17	67^{[a]}	30	96	5.30
2011	16	34	15	49	--
2010	13	29	1	30	--
Totals	61	164	60	224	3.67

^{[a]} 6th in NCAA Division I single season goals

== See also ==
- Colgate Raiders men's lacrosse
