= Chris Cameron (footballer) =

Australian rules footballer

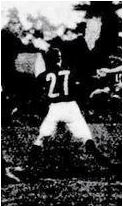
- Cameron in 1913

Personal information
- Full name: Christopher Aldane Nickels Cameron
- Born: 22 May 1894; Rushworth, Victoria
- Died: 15 August 1966 (aged 72); Glen Huntly, Victoria
- Original team: Beverley
- Height: 170 cm (5 ft 7 in)
- Weight: 65 kg (143 lb)

Playing career^{1}
Years	Club	Games (Goals)
1913	Carlton	5 (1)
- ^{1} Playing statistics correct to the end of 1913.

Christopher Aldane Nickels Cameron (22 May 1894 – 15 August 1966) was an Australian rules footballer who played with Carlton in the Victorian Football League (VFL).
