= Joe Vasta =

American lacrosse player

Personal information
- Nationality: American

Sport
- Position: Attack
- Shoots: Right
- Coached by: Rockhurst High School
- NCAA team: Air Force Academy

Joe Vasta is a former All-American lacrosse player at the United States Air Force Academy from 1983 to 1986. Vasta was the all-time NCAA scoring leader for over 20 years and is currently the tenth all-time. Vasta coaches lacrosse at Rockhurst High School in Kansas City, Missouri.

== Career ==
In 2008, Duke's Matt Danowski surpassed Vasta as the all-time NCAA leading scorer. Along with Danowski,

Vasta is one of only six NCAA players to reach the 150-150 plateau (goals and assists).

In 1986, Vasta scored 108 points which ranks 12th all time on the single season scoring list.

During his four years at Air Force, the Falcons had an overall record of 43 wins and 13 losses, which included a 12 and 1 record in 1984 and also a victory over Georgetown in 1985.

Vasta was just the ninth Air Force representative in the prestigious, at that time, North/South college lacrosse all-star game. Vasta is 11th in career goals, 6th in career assists and 5th in career points-per-game, though the NCAA does not officially recognize that statistic.

Vasta played his high school lacrosse in Croton-on-Hudson, N.Y. and is presently an MD-11 Captain with Federal Express. He is also a member of the Flying Monkey Lacrosse club of Kansas City.

Vasta is currently an assistant coach at Rockhurst High School and was the head coach of the Blue Valley Titans girls' lacrosse team at Blue Valley High School from 2009 to 2012.

== Statistics ==
=== Air Force Academy ===
Season	GP	G	A	Pts	PPG
1983	12	41	14	55	4.58
1984	13	60	23	83	6.38
1985	14	39	58	97	6.93
1986	17	33	75	108	6.35
Totals	56	173	170	343 ^{(a)}	6.13 ^{(b)}

^{(a)} 10th in Division I career points
^{(b)} 6th in career points-per-game

== See also ==
- Air Force Falcons men's lacrosse
