= Dan Marohl =

American lacrosse player

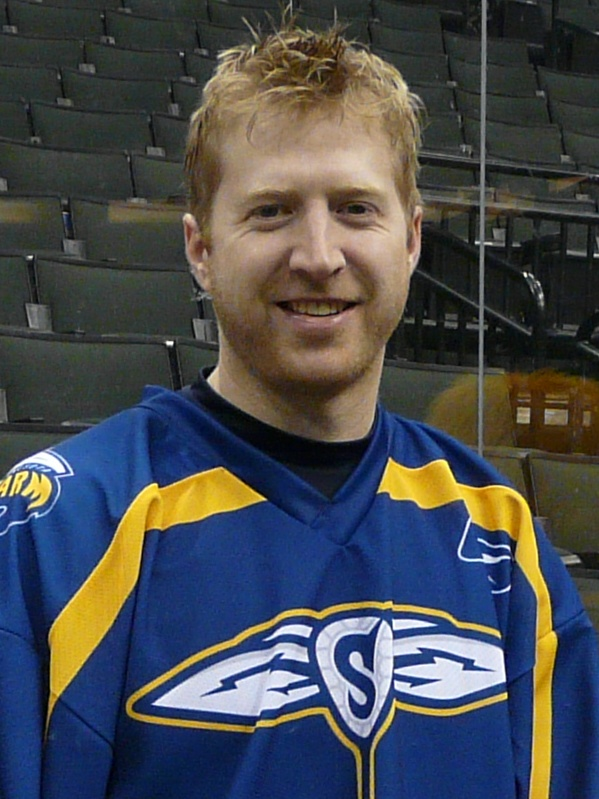

Personal information
- Nationality: American
- Born: March 30, 1978 (age 48)
- Height: 6 ft 1 in (185 cm)
- Weight: 200 lb (91 kg; 14 st 4 lb)

Sport
- Position: Offense
- Shoots: Right
- NLL team Former teams: Minnesota Swarm; Philadelphia Wings; Ottawa Rebel
- MLL teams: Los Angeles Riptide
- Pro career: 2002–

Dan Marohl (born March 30, 1978) is a former indoor lacrosse player for the Minnesota Swarm in the National Lacrosse League. Marohl attended the University of Maryland, Baltimore County, where he was teammates with former Philadelphia Wings teammate Jeff Ratcliffe.

In 1996, Marohl completed his senior year at St. Mary's High School in Annapolis, Maryland, where he led his team to a perfect 17–0 record in the ultra-competitive MIAA "A" Conference en route to the championship. Due to his excellence on the field, he was named the C. Markland Kelly Award winner - given annually to the most outstanding player in the MIAA. That year, The St. Mary's Saints finished the season ranked #1 in the national rankings by USLacrosse, making them the de facto High School National Champions.

Marohl has been named to Team USA in the 2007 World Indoor Lacrosse Championships.

On December 5, 2006, Marohl was selected by the Los Angeles Riptide in the Major League Lacrosse Supplemental Draft.

Dan Marhol is currently retired from Lacrosse and works for Veeam Software in Baltimore, Maryland.

== NLL career ==
Marohl began his career with the Ottawa Rebel, and was traded to the Philadelphia Wings during the 2003 season. He was a very accurate passer leading to many assists, while most of his goals come from outside shots. Marohl was selected to the 2006 NLL East Division All-Star team.

Marohl was traded to the Minnesota Swarm in March, 2008.

== Statistics ==
=== NLL ===
		Regular Season						Playoffs
Season	Team	GP	G	A	Pts	LB	PIM	GP	G	A	Pts	LB	PIM
2002	Ottawa	14	15	25	40	47	--	--	--	--	--	--	--
2003	Ottawa	3	1	--	1	6	--	--	--	--	--	--	--
2003	Philadelphia	12	13	28	41	35	--	--	--	--	--	--	--
2004	Philadelphia	10	13	27	40	39	--	--	--	--	--	--	--
2005	Philadelphia	16	23	57	80	71	--	--	--	--	--	--	--
2006	Philadelphia	16	21	52	73	69	2	--	--	--	--	--	--
2007	Philadelphia	16	20	44	64	71	2	--	--	--	--	--	--
2008	Philadelphia	2	1	7	8	10	0	--	--	--	--	--	--
2008	Minnesota	5	5	5	10	8	0	1	1	1	2	3	0
2009	Minnesota	13	20	25	45	35	2	--	--	--	--	--	--
NLL totals		107	132	270	402	391	6	1	1	1	2	3	0

=== UMBC ===
Season	GP	G	A	Pts	PPG
1997	12	34	19	53	4.5
1998	14	19	20	39	3.0
1999	15	30	18	48	3.2
2000	14	20	32	52	3.71
Totals	55	103	89	192	3.49

== See also ==
- Steve Marohl
