= Zack Greer =

Canadian professional lacrosse player (born 1986)

Personal information
- Born: February 12, 1986 (age 40) Whitby, Ontario, Canada
- Height: 6 ft 1 in (185 cm)
- Weight: 190 lb (86 kg; 13 st 8 lb)

Sport
- Position: Attack
- Shoots: Left
- NCAA team: Duke; Bryant (2009)
- NLL draft: 3rd overall, 2009; Minnesota Swarm
- NLL team Former teams: Las Vegas Desert Dogs; Minnesota Swarm; Saskatchewan Rush; Colorado Mammoth; San Diego Seals
- MLL draft: 3rd overall, 2009; Long Island Lizards
- MLL teams: Long Island Lizards; Denver Outlaws; Dallas Rattlers
- Pro career: 2009–
Medal record
Representing Canada
Men's lacrosse
World Lacrosse Championship
Winner	2014 Denver
Runner-up	2010 Manchester
World Indoor Lacrosse Championship
Winner	2015 Onondaga

Zack Greer (born February 12, 1986) is a Canadian professional lacrosse player who plays for the Las Vegas Desert Dogs of the National Lacrosse League. Greer attended high school at All Saints Catholic Secondary School in Whitby, and grew up playing box lacrosse. Greer's brother, Bill, plays for the Toronto Rock in the National Lacrosse League. Greer's cousin Shawn Thornton played in the National Hockey League for 14 seasons from 2002 to 2017.

== Junior career ==
Greer played junior box lacrosse with the Whitby Warriors of the OLA Junior A Lacrosse League. In 2003, he was awarded the "Joey Nieuwendyk Award" for Rookie of the Year. He was also awarded the "Dean McLeod Award" for Playoffs M.V.P in 2004.

== College career ==
=== Duke University ===
In 2007, Zack Greer and his teammate Matt Danowski led the Duke Blue Devils high powered attack to the 2007 NCAA Final Four. Duke faced Johns Hopkins University in the final, only to lose after mounting a strong comeback at the end of the game. In 2008, Greer led Division I in goals scored, helping to lead Duke to the Final Four once again. However, Duke fell short, losing to Johns Hopkins in the semi-finals.

Greer was a four-time All-American including two times on the first team at Duke. Following the 2008 season, Greer was awarded the Jack Turnbull Award given to the USILA Attackman of the year.

Resulting from "unusual circumstance," the NCAA granted 33 Duke Lacrosse players, including Greer, a rare fifth year of eligibility. This was granted to many players of the Duke lacrosse team because their season was cancelled in 2006 in mid-season because of the Duke lacrosse rape hoax.

=== Bryant University ===
Greer used his fifth year of eligibility to pursue a graduate business degree at Bryant University in the fall of 2008 where he played under former Duke head coach, Mike Pressler. In 2009, Bryant University, a former Division II school, played Division I college lacrosse for the first time. At the end of Bryant's 2009 NCAA Division 1 Season, Greer netted 42 Goals and 26 Assists combining for 68 points. Since Bryant was transitioning to Division I that season, Greer's statistics for 2009 do not count toward official NCAA Division I records.

== MLL career ==
The Long Island Lizards selected Greer with the third pick overall in the 2009 MLL draft.

The Long Island Lizards traded Greer in the 2012-2013 offseason to the Denver Outlaws in exchange for Midfielder Collin Briggs.

Greer won a MLL championship with the Denver Outlaws in 2014. Greer was selected by the Rattlers in the fifth round (42nd overall) of the 2018 MLL Supplemental Draft. As of June 18, 2018, he has yet to play a game with them. http://www.dallasrattlers.com

== NLL ==
On September 9, 2009, Greer was drafted 3rd overall in the 2009 NLL entry draft by the Minnesota Swarm. Greer finished his rookie season with 10 goals and 23 points.

== Statistics ==
=== NLL ===
Zack Greer		Regular season									Playoffs								
Season	Team	GP	G	A	Pts	LB	PIM	Pts/GP	LB/GP	PIM/GP	GP	G	A	Pts	LB	PIM	Pts/GP	LB/GP	PIM/GP
2010	Minnesota Swarm	13	10	13	23	45	14	1.77	3.46	1.08	1	1	1	2	1	0	2.00	1.00	0.00
2011	Minnesota Swarm	4	5	5	10	6	4	2.50	1.50	1.00	–	–	–	–	–	–	–	–	–
2011	Edmonton Rush	7	9	10	19	33	4	2.71	4.71	0.57	–	–	–	–	–	–	–	–	–
2012	Edmonton Rush	15	31	12	43	56	7	2.87	3.73	0.47	3	6	7	13	7	2	4.33	2.33	0.67
2013	Edmonton Rush	15	28	25	53	46	2	3.53	3.07	0.13	1	0	0	0	3	2	0.00	3.00	2.00
2014	Edmonton Rush	17	30	22	52	57	6	3.06	3.35	0.35	2	4	2	6	11	0	3.00	5.50	0.00
2015	Edmonton Rush	18	44	36	80	54	21	4.44	3.00	1.17	4	8	6	14	12	6	3.50	3.00	1.50
2016	Saskatchewan Rush	16	42	28	70	76	16	4.38	4.75	1.00	4	8	5	13	14	0	3.25	3.50	0.00
2017	Colorado Mammoth	13	22	27	49	48	4	3.77	3.69	0.31	3	5	7	12	15	0	4.00	5.00	0.00
2018	Colorado Mammoth	15	18	23	41	47	6	2.73	3.13	0.40	1	3	1	4	3	0	4.00	3.00	0.00
2020	San Diego Seals	12	21	29	50	37	6	4.17	3.08	0.50	–	–	–	–	–	–	–	–	–
2022	San Diego Seals	16	13	24	37	46	12	2.31	2.88	0.75	3	4	0	4	7	0	1.33	2.33	0.00
2023	Las Vegas Desert Dogs	16	33	23	56	46	22	3.50	2.88	1.38	–	–	–	–	–	–	–	–	–
2024	Las Vegas Desert Dogs	15	21	31	52	42	12	3.47	2.80	0.80	–	–	–	–	–	–	–	–	–
		192	327	308	635	639	136	3.31	3.33	0.71	22	39	29	68	73	10	3.09	3.32	0.45
Career Total:		214	366	337	703	712	146	3.29	3.33	0.68									

GP–Games played; G–Goals; A–Assists; Pts–Points; LB–Loose balls; PIM–Penalty minutes; Pts/GP–Points per games played; LB/GP–Loose balls per games played; PIM/GP–Penalty minutes per games played.

=== NCAA ===
Season	Team	GP	G	A	Pts	PPG
2005	Duke	20	57	15	72	3.60
2006	Duke	8	17	7	24	3.13
2007	Duke	20	67	27	94	4.70
2008	Duke	19	65	30	95	5.00
2009	Bryant	15	42	26	68	4.65
Totals		82	248 ^{(a)}	105	353 ^{(b)}	4.25

^{(a)} 1st in NCAA Men's Division I Career Goals (Greer's career goals of 248 are not officially recognized in the NCAA record books, because Greer was granted a fifth season of eligibility and Bryant was considered a reclassifying institution that season. The NCAA lists Greer's career goals record as 206 goals)
^{(b)} 5th in NCAA Men's Division I Career Points (Greer's career points mark of 353 points is not officially recognized in the NCAA record books, because Greer was granted a fifth season of eligibility and Bryant was considered a reclassifying institution that season. The NCAA lists Greer's official career points as 285 which ranks 17th)

=== MLL ===
Season	Team	Regular season											Playoffs										
Season	Team	GP	G	2PG	A	Pts	Sh	GB	Pen	PIM	FOW	FOA	GP	G	2PG	A	Pts	Sh	GB	Pen	PIM	FOW	FOA
2009	Long Island Lizards	5	12	0	2	14	28	8	0	0	0	0	1	0	0	0	0	3	2	0	3	0	0
2010	Long Island Lizards	10	17	0	3	20	59	7	0	8	0	0	2	6	0	0	6	10	4	0	1	0	0
2013	Denver Outlaws	11	18	0	10	28	55	12	0	2	0	0	1	1	0	0	1	3	0	0	0	0	0
2014	Denver Outlaws	4	4	0	8	12	11	1	0	0	0	0	2	1	0	1	2	7	1	0	0	0	0
2018	Dallas Rattlers	3	3	0	1	4	18	1	0	0	0	0	1	0	0	0	0	2	0	0	0	0	0
2019	Dallas Rattlers	9	12	0	3	15	25	7	0	0	0	0	–	–	–	–	–	–	–	–	–	–	–
		42	66	0	27	93	196	36	0	10	0	0	7	8	0	1	9	25	7	0	4	0	0
Career total:		49	74	0	28	102	221	43	0	14	0	0											

GP–Games played; G–Goals; 2PG–2-point goals; A–Assists; Pts–Points; Sh–Shots; GB–Ground balls; Pen–Penalties; PIM–Penalty minutes; FOW–Faceoffs won; FOA–Faceoffs attempted

=== OLA ===
			Regular Season					Playoffs
Season	Team	League	GP	G	A	Pts	PIM	GP	G	A	Pts	PIM
2001	Whitby Warriors	OLA Jr.A	7	4	3	7	0	1	0	0	0	0
2002	Whitby Warriors	OLA Jr.A	6	2	1	3	2	5	2	5	7	0
2003	Whitby Warriors	OLA Jr.A	13	21	18	39	8	9	9	11	20	10
2004	Whitby Warriors	OLA Jr.A	20	35	41	76	23	20	37	31	68	13
2005	Whitby Warriors	OLA Jr.A	4	8	4	12	4	6	4	14	18	7
2006	Whitby Warriors	OLA Jr.A	6	11	10	21	19	5	6	7	13	6
2007	Whitby Warriors	OLA Jr.A	11	11	17	28	13	10	8	22	30	30
2007	Brooklin Redmen	MSL	2	1	2	3	2	--	--	--	--	--
2008	Brooklin Redmen	MSL	1	0	0	0	0	0	0	0	0	0
Junior A Totals			67	92	94	186	69	56	66	90	156	66
Senior A Totals			3	1	2	3	2	0	0	0	0	0

== See also ==
- Duke Blue Devils men's lacrosse

Preceded by Matt Danowski	Jack Turnbull Award; 2008	Succeeded by Ned Crotty
