= Matt Danowski =

American lacrosse player

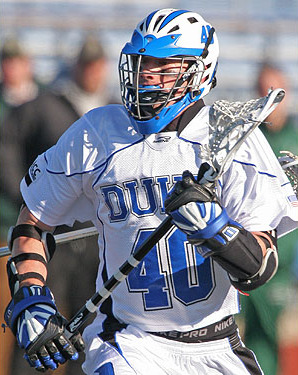

Personal information
- Nickname: Dino
- Nationality: American
- Born: August 12, 1985 (age 41) Farmingdale, New York
- Height: 6 ft 1 in (185 cm)
- Weight: 195 lb (88 kg; 13 st 13 lb)

Sport
- Position: Attack
- NLL draft: 7th overall, 2008; Colorado Mammoth
- NLL teams: Colorado Mammoth; Rochester Knighthawks; Philadelphia Wings
- MLL teams: New Jersey Pride; Long Island Lizards Charlotte Hounds; Chesapeake Bayhawks
- PLL team: Chrome LC
- NCAA team: Duke University
- Pro career: 2008–2020

Matt Danowski (born August 12, 1985) is a former professional lacrosse Attackman who played in Major League Lacrosse (MLL) and the Premier Lacrosse League (PLL) for 12 seasons. He finished his career with the Chrome Lacrosse Club, announcing his retirement on February 22, 2021. He previously played for the Chesapeake Bayhawks, Charlotte Hounds, New York Lizards, and the New Jersey Pride. Danowski also spent four seasons playing professional indoor lacrosse in the National Lacrosse League for the Colorado Mammoth, Rochester Knighthawks and Philadelphia Wings. He was a four-time college All-American at Duke University, won the Tewaaraton Trophy in 2007, and was the NCAA Division I all-time leading scorer at the time of his graduation with 353 points.

== Collegiate career ==
Danowski was a starter at Duke throughout his entire college career. As a sophomore in 2005, he won the Jack Turnbull Award, given to the nation's top collegiate attackman.

Danowski was a member of Duke squad during the 2006 Duke University lacrosse team scandal, cutting short his junior campaign to eight games after the University prematurely ended the season. Following the forced resignation of long-time Duke lacrosse coach Mike Pressler, Danowski's father, John Danowski, became the head coach of the team. Due to the shortened season, resulting from "unusual circumstance," the NCAA granted 33 Duke lacrosse players, including Danowski, a rare fifth year of eligibility.

Danowski, and teammate Zack Greer, led the Blue Devils high-powered attack to the 2007 NCAA Final Four. Duke faced Johns Hopkins University in the final, but lost despite mounting a strong comeback at the end of the game, This match-up was a repeat of the 2005 NCAA Division I Men's Lacrosse Championship game.

In 2007, Danowski won the Tewaaraton Trophy, awarded to the nation's most outstanding collegiate lacrosse player. That year, he also won the USILA's Lt. Raymond Enners Award as the national player of the year, and his second Jack Turnbull Award as attackman of the year.

In the first round of the 2008 NCAA Division I Men's Lacrosse Championship, in a victory over Loyola, Danowski broke the career points record, eclipsing Joe Vasta's mark. However, in the 2008 NCAA semifinals, Duke was again defeated by Johns Hopkins, ending Danowski's collegiate career without winning an NCAA championship. In 2008, he was again awarded the Lt. Raymond Enners Award as national player of the year.

== Professional career ==
Only a few days after Danowski was awarded the 2008 Enners award as the USILA player of the year, he was drafted second overall by the New Jersey Pride in the 2008 Major League Lacrosse Collegiate Draft.

Danowski earned Rookie of the Week honors in Week 5 of the 2008 MLL season. He has scored 19 goals in 12 games with 3 two-point goals and 14 assists giving him a total of 36 points.

In July 2009, Danowski was traded from the Colorado Mammoth to the New York Titans in exchange for Ryan Powell. Danowski becomes the fourth player in 2009 to play both for the Lizards of the MLL and the Titans of the NLL in the same season, joining Stephen Peyser, Matt Zash, and Keith Cromwell.

In 2011, Danowski was traded from the Long Island Lizards to the Charlotte Hounds along with Stephen Berger and two other draft picks in exchange for the No.1 pick in the 2012 MLL Collegiate Draft Pick. The Hounds also gave up former Boston Canon MLL-All Star Max Quinzani whom Charlotte just picked up in the expansion draft.

Danowski joined roughly 140 professional players leaving the MLL for the newly formed PLL in 2018. He was an important staple for the Chrome Lacrosse Club during the inaugural 2019 season, playing in all ten games. Danowski did not play during the shortened 2020 season bubble tournament during the COVID-19 pandemic, and on February 22, 2021, he announced his retirement from professional lacrosse.

== Family ==
Matt Danowski's father, John Danowski, is the Duke men's lacrosse head coach since June 2006. Matt's grandfather, Ed Danowski, was as a quarterback for the New York Giants and led them to two championships in 1935 and 1938.

== Statistics ==
=== Duke University ===
Season	GP	G	A	Pts	PPG
2004	13	23	19	42	--
2005	20	50	42	92	--
2006	8	12	14	26	--
2007	20	44	52	96	--
2008	19	41	56	97	--
Totals	80	170	183 ^{(a)}	353 ^{(b)}	--

^{(a)} 6th in NCAA Division I career assists
^{(b)} 3rd in NCAA Division I career points

=== MLL & PLL ===
Season	Team	GP	G	2ptG	A	Pts	GB
Major League Lacrosse
2008	New Jersey	10	19	3	14	36	16
2009	Long Island	12	16	1	14	31	31
2010	Long Island	12	25	4	18	47	17
2011	Long Island	12	23	7	11	41	23
2012	Charlotte	13	19	5	19	43	22
2013	Charlotte	12	33	6	10	49	16
2014	Charlotte	12	24	2	5	31	9
2015	Chesapeake	12	19	0	24	43	13
2016	Chesapeake	12	20	0	12	32	17
2017	Chesapeake	10	20	2	13	35	12
2018	Chesapeake	6	7	0	10	17	3
Premier Lacrosse League
2019	Chrome LC	10	7	1	6	15	3
Totals		133	232	31	156	420	182

=== National Lacrosse League ===
Season	Team	GP	G	A	Pts	LB
2009	Colorado	9	7	7	14	18
2010	Rochester	1	0	0	0	4
2011	Philadelphia	3	2	4	6	10
2012	Philadelphia	4	3	4	7	9
Totals		17	12	15	27	41

== Awards ==
- Seven-time MLL All-Star (2008, 2009, 2010, 2011, 2012, 2013, 2014)
- Tewaaraton Trophy (2007)
- Four-time USILA All-American (2004, 2005, 2007, 2008)
- Lt. Raymond Enners Award (2007, 2008)
- Jack Turnbull Award (2005, 2007)
- Atlantic Coast Conference Player of the Year (2005)
- Atlantic Coast Conference Rookie of the Year (2004)

Preceded by Michael Powell	Jack Turnbull Award; 2005	Succeeded by Joe Walters
Preceded by Joe Walters	Jack Turnbull Award; 2007	Succeeded by Zack Greer
Preceded by Matt Ward	Lt. Raymond Enners Award; 2007; 2008	Succeeded by Max Seibald
Preceded by Matt Ward	Tewaaraton Trophy; 2007	Succeeded by Mike Leveille
