= Anthony DiMarzo =

American lacrosse player

Personal information
- Nationality: American

Sport
- Position: Attack
- Shoots: Right
- NCAA team: University of Delaware

Career highlights

Anthony DiMarzo was an All-American lacrosse player at University of Delaware from 1992 to 1995, with 98 goals and 153 assists for 251 points in 58 games.

== Playing career ==
As a sophomore in 1993, DiMarzo was voted an honorable mention All-America by the US Intercollegiate Lacrosse Association and led the nation in assists with a then team record of 50, since broken in 1999 by John Grant Jr. The Blue Hen's went undefeated in the North Atlantic Conference and ranked in the top 20 three straight years during DiMarzo's scholastic career.

DiMarzo ranked No. 2 nationally as a senior in 1995 when he scored a then school record 78 points on 39 goals and 39 assists. DiMarzo was voted first team attack along with Grant, on the University of Delaware Blue Hen's men's lacrosse 60th anniversary all-time team. Curtis Dickson in 2010, broke the Delaware school record active point-scoring streak of 47 games by Anthony DiMarzo set in 1992–95.

DiMarzo's 153 career assists places him fifteenth on the all-time list and DiMarzo is also the all-time leading Blue Hen scorer. He was a three-time All-American while at Delaware and was inducted into the Delaware Athletics Hall of Fame in 2008.

DiMarzo was a schoolboy star at New York's Lakeland High School where he scored 69 goals as a senior in 1991.

DiMarzo's offensive coordinator while at Delaware was current Albany head coach Scott Marr.

== Statistics ==
=== University of Delaware ===
Season	GP	G	A	Pts	PPG
1992	15	14	27	41	2.73
1993	14	26	50	76	5.43
1994	14	19	37	56	4.00
1995	15	39	39	78	5.20
Totals	56	98	153(a)	251(b)	4.48

(a) 15th in NCAA career assists
(b) 1st in University of Delaware career points

== See also ==
- University of Delaware Mens Lacrosse
