= Air Force Falcons men's lacrosse =

College men's lacrosse team representing the United States Air Force Academy

- Founded: 1967
- University: United States Air Force Academy
- Head coach: Bill Wilson (since 2018 season)
- Stadium: Falcon Stadium (capacity: 46,692)
- Location: Colorado Springs, Colorado
- Conference: ASUN Conference
- Nickname: Falcons
- Colors: Blue and silver

NCAA Tournament Quarterfinals
- (1) – 1971

NCAA Tournament appearances
- (6) – 1971, 1988, 2014, 2016, 2017, 2025

Conference Tournament championships
- (4) – 2014, 2016, 2017, 2025

Conference regular season championships
- (7) – 2014, 2016, 2017, 2019, 2024, 2025, 2026

The Air Force Falcons men's lacrosse team represents the United States Air Force Academy in National Collegiate Athletic Association (NCAA) Division I college lacrosse. The program was created in 1967. Air Force plays its home games at Falcon Stadium, which has a capacity of 46,692. The Falcons played their first season in the ASUN Conference in spring 2022 after having played the previous six seasons in the Southern Conference, with previous conference membership in the Great Western Lacrosse League and the ECAC Lacrosse League. Through 2025, the team has an all–time record of 448–337.

The Falcons appeared in the first NCAA Division I Men's Lacrosse Championship in 1971, losing to Maryland 10–1. In 2014, Air Force won its first NCAA Men's Lacrosse Tournament game, defeating Richmond in a play-in game, 13–5, before falling to Duke, 20–9, in the first round.

In 2016, the Falcons joined the Southern Conference as an associate member for men's lacrosse, increasing the conference's membership to eight teams. Since then, Air Force has captured three regular-season conference championships and two conference tournament championships, with NCAA tournament appearances in 2016 and 2017.

After the 2021 season, Air Force men's lacrosse joined the newly reinstated men's lacrosse league of the ASUN Conference.

== Season results ==
The following is a list of Air Force's results by season since it began NCAA lacrosse competition in 1971:

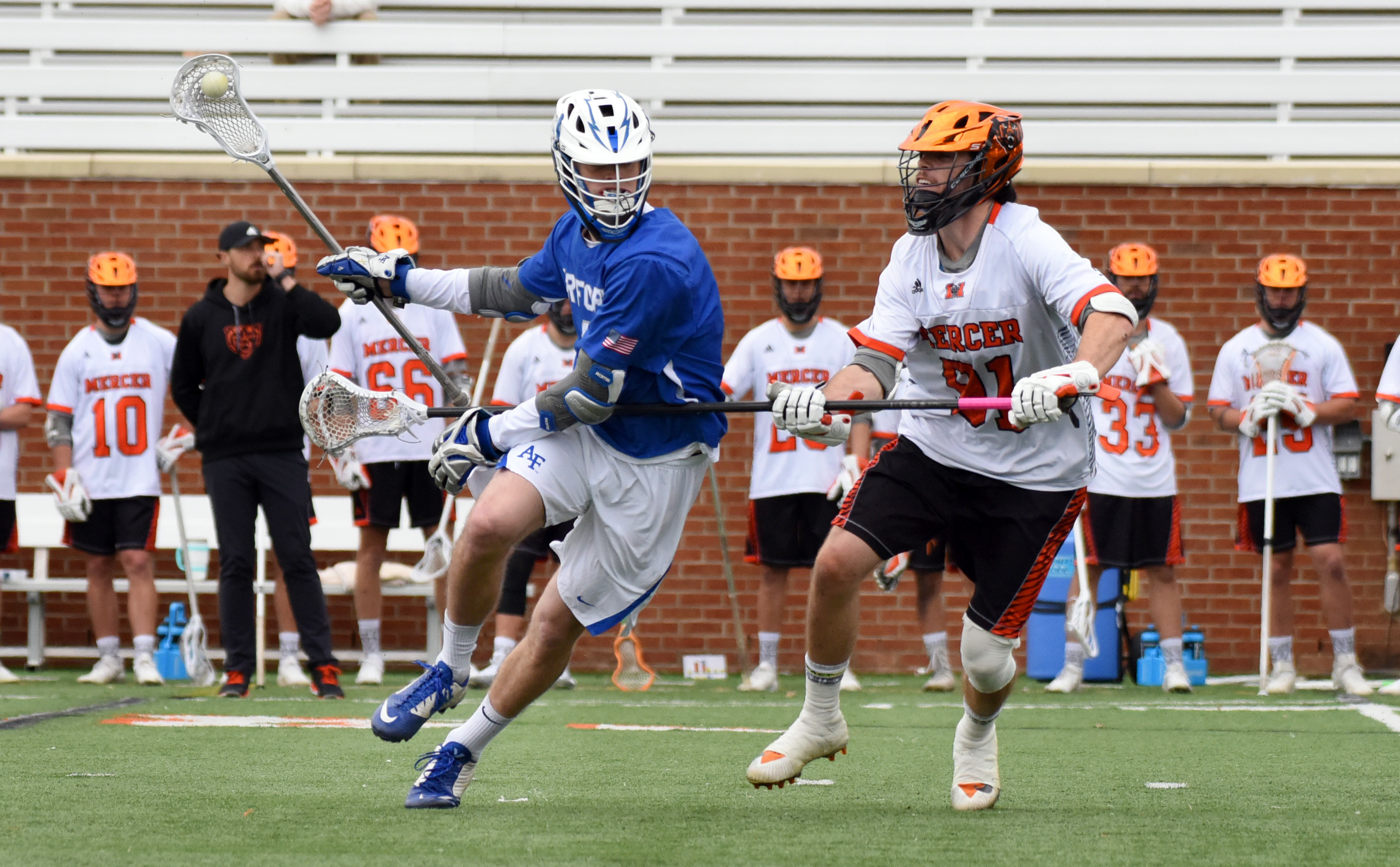
A game between Air Force and Mercer in 2019

Season	Coach	Overall	Conference	Standing	Postseason
Jim Keating (Independent) (1968–1974)
1971	Jim Keating	10–1			NCAA Division I Quarterfinals
1972	Jim Keating	8–2			
1973	Jim Keating	7–3			
1974	Jim Keating	9–2			
Jim Keating:		58–17 (.773)			
Bill Markham (Independent) (1975–1977)
1975	Bill Markham	7–2			
1976	Bill Markham	5–3			
1977	Bill Markham	11–3			
Bill Markham:		23–8 (.742)			
Dan Ulmer (Independent) (1978–1979)
1978	Dan Ulmer	9–4			
1979	Dan Ulmer	11–5			
Dan Ulmer:		20–9 (.690)			
Charles Stevens (Independent) (1980–1983)
1980	Charles Stevens	11–4			
1981	Charles Stevens	11–2			
1982	Charles Stevens	10–3			
1983	Charles Stevens	6–6			
Charles Stevens:		38–15 (.717)			
Rich Long (Independent) (1984–1985)
1984	Rich Long	12–1			
Rich Long:		12–1(.923)			
Scott Petosa (Independent) (1985–1986)
1985	Scott Petosa	10–4			
1986	Scott Petosa	15–2			
Mike Hittle (Independent) (1987–1988)
1987	Mike Hittle	12–4			
Mike Hittle:		12–4 (.750)			
Scott Petosa (Independent) (1988–1989)
1988	Scott Petosa	13–4			NCAA Division I First Round
1989	Scott Petosa	10–3			
Scott Petosa:		48–13 (.787)			
Chris Cicere (Independent) (1990–1992)
1990	Chris Cicere	9–7			
1991	Chris Cicere	8–6			
1992	Chris Cicere	9–7			
Chris Cicere:		26–20 (.565)			
Tom Duggan (Great Western Lacrosse League) (1993–1994)
1993	Tom Duggan	5–7	1–2		
1994	Tom Duggan	5–8	1–3		
Tom Duggan:		10–15 (.400)	2–5 (.286)		
Terry Leary (Great Western Lacrosse League) (1995–1997)
1995	Terry Leary	9–3	3–1		
1996	Terry Leary	7–4	0–4	5th	
1997	Terry Leary	7–5	1–2		
Terry Leary:		23–12 (.657)	4–7 (.364)		
Fred Acee (Great Western Lacrosse League) (1998–2008)
1998	Fred Acee	4–7	1–3		
1999	Fred Acee	2–11	0–4	5th	
2000	Fred Acee	2–12	0–4	5th	
2001	Fred Acee	3–12	0–5	6th	
2002	Fred Acee	4–8	2–3		
2003	Fred Acee	3–10	1–4		
2004	Fred Acee	4–8	2–3		
2005	Fred Acee	4–8	1–4		
2006	Fred Acee	7–9	2–3		
2007	Fred Acee	2–10	1–4		
2008	Fred Acee	3–9	1–4		
Fred Acee:		38–104 (.268)	11–41 (.212)		
Eric Seremet (Great Western Lacrosse League) (2009–2010)
2009	Eric Seremet	7–7	4–1	2nd	
Eric Seremet (ECAC Lacrosse League) (2010–2014)
2010	Eric Seremet	1–13	0–7	8th	
2011	Eric Seremet	6–7	3–3	T–3rd	
2012	Eric Seremet	6–7	1–5	6th	
2013	Eric Seremet	7–7	2–5	T–6th	
2014	Eric Seremet	11–6	3–1	T–1st	NCAA Division I First Round
Eric Seremet (Independent) (2015–2016)
2015	Eric Seremet	8–7			
Eric Seremet (Southern Conference) (2016–2017)
2016	Eric Seremet	15–3	7–0	1st	NCAA Division I First Round
2017	Eric Seremet	12–6	6–1	T–1st	NCAA Division I First Round
Eric Seremet:		73–63 (.537)	26–23 (.531)		
Bill Wilson (Southern Conference) (2018–2021)
2018	Bill Wilson	5–10	3–4	5th	
2019	Bill Wilson	10–5	6–1	T–1st	
2020	Bill Wilson	4–3	0–0	†	†
2021	Bill Wilson	4–9	3–3	4th	
Bill Wilson (ASUN Conference) (2022–present)
2022	Bill Wilson	8–7	3–2	3rd	
2023	Bill Wilson	11–6	7–2	T–2nd	
2024	Bill Wilson	9–6	8–1	T–1st	
2025	Bill Wilson	9–8	4–1	T–1st	NCAA Division I First Round
2026	Bill Wilson	7–8	4–1	T–1st	
Bill Wilson:		67–62 (.519)	38–15 (.717)		
Total:		455–345 (.569)			
National champion Postseason invitational champion Conference regular season champion Conference regular season and conference tournament champion Division regular season champion Division regular season and conference tournament champion Conference tournament champion

†NCAA canceled 2020 collegiate activities due to COVID-19.

== See also ==
- Joe Vasta
