= Chris Cameron (lacrosse) =

American lacrosse player

Personal information
- Nationality: American
- Born: Long Island, New York, U.S.
- Height: 6 ft 4 in (193 cm)
- Weight: 200 lb (91 kg; 14 st 4 lb)

Sport
- Position: Attack
- Shoots: Left
- Coached by: Bishop Guertin High School
- NLL teams: Boston Blazers
- NCAA team: Lehigh University
- Pro career: 1992–1994

Career highlights
- Among all-time Division I Career Points with 308; 1989 Division I All American, Honorable Mention

Chris Cameron was an All-American lacrosse player at Lehigh University from 1986 to 1989 who twice led the nation in scoring.

== Playing career ==
Cameron is among the all-time leaders in Division I scoring with 122 goal and 186 assists for 308 career points.

Cameron played his prep ball at Walt Whitman on Long Island before being recruited to Lehigh.

Chris's top season was 1986 when he scored 40 goals and handed out 53 assists for 93 total point in 14 games while leading the nation in scoring that season. Cameron's senior season, he was voted All-American and was selected to play in the North-South All-Star Classic. He led the Engineers to an 8–6 record in 1986 and 9–5 in 1987, and was also inducted into the Lehigh University Hall of Fame. Cameron was the 4th player in NCAA Division I to surpass 300 career points.

Cameron also excelled at soccer where he helped lead Lehigh to a 13-5-2 record in his senior season while serving as captain and being named a Regional All-American. Cameron played professional lacrosse for the National Lacrosse League's Boston Blazers from 1992 to 1994, tallying a total of 11 goals and 22 assists in 19 games.

== Coaching career ==
Cameron is currently the lacrosse coach at Bishop Guertin High School in New Hampshire. Bishop Guertin currently has 14 division 1 state titles for New Hampshire. Most recently, he led his team to 5 straight state championship victories from 2020 to 2025. Out of 31 lacrosse state titles in NH, Camerons cardinals have been to 20 consecutive state championship games, winning 14. In 2026 Bishop Guertin's in state win streak was snapped at 86 games by pinkerton in an 8–7 loss.

Cameron is the father of Kristin, Brian, and Sean.

== Statistics ==
=== Lehigh University ===
Season	GP	G	A	Pts	PPG
1986	14	40	53	93	6.64
1987	14	33	45	78	5.57
1988	13	27	48	75	5.77
1989	14	22	40	62	4.43
Totals	55	122	186 (a)	308 (b)	5.60 (c)

(a) 9th in NCAA career assists
(b) 14th in NCAA career points
(c) 12th in NCAA career points-per-game

____________________________________________

=== NLL ===
		Regular Season						Playoffs
Season	Team	GP	G	A	Pts	LB	PIM	GP	G	A	Pts	LB	PIM
1992	Boston	8	3	9	12	36	0	1	0	0	0	4	2
1993	Boston	5	5	3	8	18	0	2	1	5	6	9	0
1994	Boston	6	3	10	13	40	0	--	--	--	--	--	--
NLL totals		19	11	22	33	94	0	3	1	5	6	13	2

____________________________________________

== See also ==
- Lehigh Mountain Hawks men's lacrosse

== External References ==
- Chris Cameron Former Lehigh Lacrosse Star Finds Things Different In Pro League, The Morning Call, Feb 28, 1991
