= Steve Marohl =

American lacrosse player

Personal information
- Nationality: American

Sport
- Position: Attack
- NLL teams: Baltimore Thunder; Pittsburgh CrosseFire
- NCAA team: University of Maryland, Baltimore County
- Pro career: 1993–2000

Career highlights
- 2nd all-time in Single Season Assists; 8th all-time in Single Season Points; 3rd Team All American, 1992

Steve Marohl was an All-American lacrosse player at UMBC from 1988 to 1992.

== Career ==
Marohl is among the all-time Division I leaders in single-season scoring with 37 goal and 77 assists for 114 points in 15 games. He is also the all-time career leading scorer at UMBC with 105 goals and 137 assists for 242 points. He was selected third team All American in 1992. Marohl's 12 assists against University of Pennsylvania remains the single game record. In his final two seasons at UMBC, the Retrievers had 10-5 records each year, including wins against Maryland, Notre Dame, Penn and Ohio State. UMBC was coached then by National lacrosse Hall of Fame former Johns Hopkins player, Dick Watts.

Marohl played professionally for the National Lacrosse League's Baltimore Thunder in 1993 and Pittsburgh CrosseFire in 2000. Marohl was also on the Major League Lacrosse Baltimore Bayhawks roster in 2004 and 2006 where he tallied 20 goals and 14 assists in 18 games. His brother, Dan Marohl, was an all-star playing for the NLL Minnesota Swarm.

Steve is a member of the UMBC Hall of Fame and has worked as an analyst for the UMBC flagship station WNST (AM-1570). Marohl was also a commenter and host of a financial talk show on WNAV in Annapolis.

Marohl is originally from Edgewater, MD and attended South River High School. In 2012, Marohl was an assistant coach for the undefeated state title South River Seahawks (Anne Arundel County).

== Statistics ==
=== UMBC ===
Season	GP	G	A	Pts	PPG
1989	14	14	13	27	1.93
1990	13	24	17	41	3.15
1991	15	30	30	60	4.00
1992	15	37	77 ^{(a)}	114 ^{(b)}	7.60 ^{(c)}
Totals	57	105	137	242	4.25

^{(a)} 2nd in NCAA single season assists
^{(b)} 8th in NCAA single season points
^{(c)} 3rd in single season points-per-game

________________________

=== NLL ===
		Regular Season						Playoffs
Season	Team	GP	G	A	Pts	LB	PIM	GP	G	A	Pts	LB	PIM
1993	Pittsburgh	8	4	7	11	23	2	--	--	--	--	--	--
2000	Pittsburgh	1	0	0	0	0	0	--	--	--	--	--	--
NLL totals		9	4	7	11	23	2	0	0	0	0	0	0

== See also ==
- UMBC Retrievers men's lacrosse
- Dan Marohl
