= Max Quinzani =

American lacrosse player (born 1988)

Personal information
- Nationality: American
- Born: March 20, 1988 (age 38) Duxbury, Massachusetts, U.S.
- Height: 5 ft 8 in (173 cm)
- Weight: 170 lb (77 kg; 12 st 2 lb)

Sport
- Position: Investment Banker
- Shoots: High to high
- NLL draft: 20th overall, 2010; Philadelphia Wings
- NLL team: Philadelphia Wings
- MLL team: Boston Cannons
- NCAA team: Duke University

Max Quinzani (born March 20, 1988) is an MLL professional lacrosse player, formerly of the NCAA Division I college lacrosse team in Duke University. Quinzani played attack at 5'8 and 170 pounds in his collegiate career.

== Career ==
Quinzani attended Duke University and played in the Attack position for Lacrosse across all 5 years of his collegiate career. He has the nation’s longest scoring streak at 46 games, ranks sixth on the Duke career list for goals, and received the ACC Academic Honor Roll choice and a two-time Academic All-America selection. On May 31, 2010, Max and the Duke Lacrosse team won their first ever Division I NCAA Men's Lacrosse Championship. During his collegiate career, Quinzani scored 199 goals, which is second all time in Division I Lacrosse. In 2010, Quinzani was chosen third overall by the Boston Cannons in the 2010 MLL Draft. Max played his first professional game on Saturday, June 12, 2010 . He scored a hat-trick in the game. Former Duxbury High School teammates Chris Ajemian, Chris Nixon and Kevin Gould were also selected by the Boston Cannons in the Draft. Quinzani has since been cut by the Long Island Lizards.

== Family ==
Quinzani's two brothers also play college lacrosse with Gus Quinzani playing at St. Joes and Wes Quinzani who will be playing at Middlebury College in Vermont. Quinzani also famously scored the go ahead goal for the Cannons with seconds left in the 2011 MLL Semifinal. He was unable to produce points in the Final despite a winning outcome for his team.

Quinzani was a four-year letterman at Duxbury under coach Chris Sweet, where his team won state championships in 2004, 2005 and 2006.

== Duke University ==
| Season | GP | G | A | Pts | PPG |
|---|---|---|---|---|---|
| 2007 | 20 | 24 | 4 | 28 | -- |
| 2008 | 20 | 61 | 8 | 69 | -- |
| 2009 | 19 | 46 | 11 | 57 | -- |
| 2010 | 20 | 68 | 14 | 82 | -- |
| Totals | 79 | 199 (a) | 37 | 236 | -- |

^{(a)} 2nd in NCAA Division I career goals

== See also ==
- Duke Blue Devils men's lacrosse
