= Darren Lowe (lacrosse) =

American lacrosse player

Personal information
- Nationality: American
- Height: 5 ft 11 in (180 cm)
- Weight: 185 lb (84 kg; 13 st 3 lb)

Sport
- Position: Attack
- NLL teams: New York Saints
- NCAA team: Brown University
- Pro career: 1996–2000

Career highlights
- 1992 USILA Player of the Year

Darren Lowe was a three-time All-American NCAA lacrosse player at Brown University from 1989 to 1992 who led his team to three straight NCAA tournament quarterfinal appearances.

== Career highlights ==
During Lowe's four years at Brown, the team compiled a record of 45 wins and 16 losses, with the 1991 squad compiling a 13 and 1 record. The 1991 team went undefeated during the regular season and received a number two seeding in the NCAA tournament before finally falling to Maryland in the quarterfinals. Brown made the NCAA tournament in three out of Lowe's four seasons, with a tournament record of two wins and three losses.

Lowe is among the leaders with 316 career points. He was also a key member of the US squad during the 1998 World Lacrosse Championship, with the final game against Canada often cited as one of the best field lacrosse matches of all time. Lowe received the Lt. Raymond Enners Award as the USILA national player of the year and the Jack Turnbull Award as the nation's top attackman in 1992. He was inducted into the U.S. Lacrosse Hall of Fame in 2007. Lowe was coached at Brown by former Virginia Cavaliers coach Dom Starsia.

== The Lowe Family ==
Darren's father, Alan, who played at the University of Maryland, College Park, is also in the National Lacrosse Hall of Fame. Darren's brother, Kevin Lowe, was an All-American at Princeton who won the Jack Turnbull Award in 1994 and was also inducted into the Lacrosse Hall of Fame in 2009. Darren and Sierra Lowe have two boys, Carson & Lucas.

Darren also played four seasons of professional lacrosse with the New York Saints.

Both Kevin Lowe and Darren Lowe played post-collegiate lacrosse for the Long Island-Hofstra lacrosse club. The Lowe brothers were well known for their “high IQ” patient offensive style. Both brothers played for the Long Island-Hofstra lacrosse club in the storied 1996 USCLA Championship (held at Cabrini College) victory over Team Toyota which featured Quint Kessenich, Gary Gait, and Paul Gait.

Lowe is currently a board member of USA Lacrosse.

== Statistics ==
=== NLL ===
		Regular season				Playoffs
Season	Team	GP	G	A	Pts	GP	G	A	Pts
1996	New York	10	4	19	23	--	--	--	--
1997	New York	10	4	19	23	1	--	3	3
1999	New York	12	13	35	48	--	--	--	--
2000	New York	12	7	34	41	--	--	--	--
NLL totals		44	28	107	135	1	--	3	3

=== Brown University ===
Season	GP	G	A	Pts	PPG
1989	15	21	27	48	3.27
1990	16	24	65	89	5.50
1991	14	30	47	77	5.50
1992	16	36	66	102 ^{(a)}	6.38
Totals	61	111	205 ^{(b)}	316 ^{(c)}	5.18

^{(a)} Lowe's 102 point ranks 15th all-time in NCAA single-season points
^{(b)} 5th in NCAA career assists
^{(c)} 11th in career points

== See also ==
- 1991 NCAA Division I Men's Lacrosse Championship
- Brown Bears men's lacrosse
- Members of the National Lacrosse Hall of Fame
