= Terry Riordan =

Lacrosse player

Personal information
- Nationality: American
- Born: July 27, 1973 (age 53)
- Height: 6 ft 5 in (196 cm)
- Weight: 230 lb (100 kg; 16 st 6 lb)

Sport
- Position: Attack
- Shoots: Left
- MLL team Former teams: Los Angeles Riptide; Long Island Lizards
- NCAA team: Johns Hopkins University
- Pro career: 2001–

Career highlights
- 7th in NCAA Division I career goals; 1st in career point at Johns Hopkins

Terry Riordan (born July 27, 1973) is a former professional lacrosse player. He was a member of Major League Lacrosse's Los Angeles Riptide and plays attack. He also played for the Long Island Lizards in 2001 and 2002. Terry's brother James played lacrosse at Penn and another brother, Dan, had a brief career in the NLL. In 2008, Riordan scored 13 goals with 2 assists in helping the Riptide to a 7 and 5 record.

== College career ==
Riordan played high school lacrosse in Baldwin, Long Island where he was All-County. He attended Johns Hopkins University where he led the Blue Jays to three NCAA Men's Lacrosse Championship semifinal and one quarterfinal appearance. He was a four-time All-American and twice named to the first team. He is fourth all-time in goals scored in NCAA history and is currently the all-time goal scorer and all-time Blue Jays points leader as well. Riordan won the Jack Turnbull Award and Lt. Raymond Enners Award in 1995.

== Acting career ==
In addition to his career in professional lacrosse, Terry pursued professional acting attending the Lee Strasberg institute. He appeared in the television series Rescue Me, As the World Turns and The Guiding Light. Riordan was also in the 2007 Broadway revival, The Ritz.

== Statistics ==
=== Johns Hopkins University ===
Season	Team	GP	G	A	Pts	PPG
1992		14	37	17	54	3.93
1993		14	47	19	66	4.64
1994		14	48	10	58	4.14
1995		14	52	17	69	4.93
NCAA Totals		56	184 ^{[a]}	63	247 ^{[b]}	4.41

^{[a]} 11th in NCAA Division I career goals
^{[b]} 1st in career point at Johns Hopkins

=== MLL ===
		Regular Season							Playoffs
Season	Team	GP	G	A	Pts	LB	PIM	GP	G	2ptG	A	Pts	LB	PIM
2001	Long Island	13	36	2	38	21	7.5	2	6	0	2	8	4	0
2002	Long Island	10	28	2	30	24	3.5	2	3	0	0	3	4	1.0
2007	Los Angeles	12	29	3	32	8	1.0	2	6	0	0	6	4	1.0
MLL Totals		35	73	7	100	53	11.5	6	15	0	2	17	12	2.0

== See also ==
- Johns Hopkins Blue Jays lacrosse

== Awards ==
Preceded by Scott Bacigalupo	Lt. Raymond Enners Award; 1995	Succeeded by Doug Knight
