= Jeff Shattler =

Lacrosse player

Personal information
- Nickname: Shatts
- Born: December 26, 1984 (age 41) Edmonton, Alberta, Canada
- Height: 6 ft 0 in (183 cm)
- Weight: 205 lb (93 kg; 14 st 9 lb)

Sport
- Position: Forward/Transition
- Shoots: Left
- NLL draft: 10th overall, 2005; Buffalo Bandits
- NLL team Former teams: Saskatchewan Rush; Calgary Roughnecks; Buffalo Bandits
- WLA team Former teams: Victoria Shamrocks; Brampton Excelsiors (MSL); Six Nations Chiefs (MSL); Maple Ridge Burrards; Nanaimo Timbermen
- Pro career: 2006–

Career highlights
- NLL Most Valuable Player, 2011; NLL Transition Player of the Year, 2011; WLA Most Outstanding Player, 2013; WILC All World Team - Transition, 2015; NLL Cup Most Valuable Player, 2018
Medal record
Box lacrosse
Representing Haudenosaunee
World Indoor Lacrosse Championship
Silver medal – second place	2015 Onondaga Nation
Silver medal – second place	2011 Czech Republic

Jeff Shattler (born December 26, 1984) is a Haudenosaunee professional box lacrosse player who currently plays with the Saskatchewan Rush of the National Lacrosse League (NLL). He has Ojibwe and Inuit roots and has competed internationally with the Iroquois Nationals, including with the World Indoor Lacrosse Championship silver medal-winning teams in 2011 and 2015. He was the 2011 NLL Most Valuable Player, 2011 NLL Transition Player of the Year, and the 2018 NLL Cup Most Valuable Player.

== Professional career ==
Shattler was drafted 10th overall by the Buffalo Bandits in 2005. He played one game in 2006 for the Bandits before being traded to Calgary for the 2007 season. Shattler played 11 seasons with the Roughnecks, missing only one game. During the 2009 NLL season, he was named a reserve in the All-Star Game. Shattler had a breakout year in 2011, when he was named both NLL MVP and Transition Player of the Year. On August 3, 2017, he signed a two-year contract with the Saskatchewan Rush.

Shattler has played for the Brampton Excelsiors and Six Nations Chiefs of Major Series Lacrosse and the Victoria Shamrocks and the Maple Ridge Burrards of the Western Lacrosse Association (WLA). Shattler was the Most Outstanding Player in the WLA in 2013.

=== NLL stats ===
Jeff Shattler		Regular season									Playoffs								
Season	Team	GP	G	A	Pts	LB	PIM	Pts/GP	LB/GP	PIM/GP	GP	G	A	Pts	LB	PIM	Pts/GP	LB/GP	PIM/GP
2006	Buffalo Bandits	1	0	1	1	3	0	1.00	3.00	0.00	0	0	0	0	0	0	0.00	0.00	0.00
2007	Calgary Roughnecks	16	16	21	37	114	10	2.31	7.13	0.63	1	0	4	4	10	0	4.00	10.00	0.00
2008	Calgary Roughnecks	16	17	26	43	110	12	2.69	6.88	0.75	2	6	5	11	26	0	5.50	13.00	0.00
2009	Calgary Roughnecks	16	13	15	28	119	15	1.75	7.44	0.94	3	2	3	5	21	4	1.67	7.00	1.33
2010	Calgary Roughnecks	16	16	35	51	141	8	3.19	8.81	0.50	1	0	1	1	9	0	1.00	9.00	0.00
2011	Calgary Roughnecks	15	29	46	75	93	20	5.00	6.20	1.33	2	2	6	8	6	4	4.00	3.00	2.00
2012	Calgary Roughnecks	16	31	41	72	111	6	4.50	6.94	0.38	1	2	3	5	2	4	5.00	2.00	4.00
2013	Calgary Roughnecks	16	33	41	74	86	20	4.63	5.38	1.25	2	3	8	11	6	0	5.50	3.00	0.00
2014	Calgary Roughnecks	18	35	49	84	71	10	4.67	3.94	0.56	7	9	12	21	30	12	3.00	4.29	1.71
2015	Calgary Roughnecks	18	28	34	62	74	12	3.44	4.11	0.67	4	1	8	9	9	0	2.25	2.25	0.00
2016	Calgary Roughnecks	18	30	57	87	92	4	4.83	5.11	0.22	3	2	8	10	13	0	3.33	4.33	0.00
2017	Calgary Roughnecks	18	20	51	71	95	11	3.94	5.28	0.61	0	0	0	0	0	0	0.00	0.00	0.00
2018	Saskatchewan Rush	17	24	36	60	76	8	3.53	4.47	0.47	4	8	7	15	13	0	3.75	3.25	0.00
2019	Saskatchewan Rush	18	34	39	73	86	14	4.06	4.78	0.78	1	2	3	5	5	0	5.00	5.00	0.00
		229	337	508	845	1,310	154	3.69	5.72	0.67	31	37	68	105	150	24	3.39	4.84	0.77
Career Total:		260	374	576	950	1,460	178	3.65	5.62	0.68									

GP–Games played; G–Goals; A–Assists; Pts–Points; LB–Loose balls; PIM–Penalty minutes; Pts/GP–Points per games played; LB/GP–Loose balls per games played; PIM/GP–Penalty minutes per games played.

== International career ==
Box lacrosse

Representing Haudenosaunee

World Indoor Lacrosse Championship
Silver medal – second place	2015 Onondaga Nation	
Silver medal – second place	2011 Czech Republic	

Shattler has competed internationally with the Iroquois Nationals, the national box lacrosse team of the Haudenosaunee Confederacy. By virtue of his First Nations status, it would have been possible for him to play for Canada, the United States, or the Nationals. About choosing to play with the Nationals, Shattler said, “It’s always been my culture... Probably my grandma [a full–status Ojibwa] would kill me if I did play for Team Canada.“

With the Nationals, Shattler won silver medals at the World Indoor Lacrosse Championships (WILC) in 2011 and 2015. He was named to the 2015 WLIC All World Team at the transition position.

== Awards and honours ==
Preceded by Casey Powell	NLL Most Valuable Player; 2011	Succeeded by John Grant, Jr.
Preceded by Brodie Merrill	NLL Transition Player of the Year; 2011	Succeeded by Andrew Suitor

- Mann Cup, 2008 (with the Brampton Excelsiors)
- NLL Champions Cup, 2009 (with the Calgary Roughnecks)
- WLA Most Outstanding Player, 2013
- NLL Cup, 2018 (with the Saskatchewan Rush)
- NLL Cup Most Valuable Player, 2018

== Coaching and youth development ==
In February 2019, Shattler established the Shattler Lacrosse Academy, a privately owned elite lacrosse academy sanctioned by the Saskatchewan Lacrosse Association (SLA).

In addition to organizing clinics and offering private training through his namesake academy, Shattler serves as Director of Player Development and Coaching for the Fighting Sioux lacrosse program of Standing Buffalo Dakota Nation, a role he has held since 2019. His is also involved in an effort to establish a nations cup between eight reserves in the Sanding Buffalo Dakota Nation and File Hills Qu’Appelle Tribal Council (FHQ) Treaty 4 area.

He also dedicates time to clinics and programs that aim to expand opportunities for girls in lacrosse, including working once a month with Queens Lacrosse of Queen City Minor Box Lacrosse league (QCMBL), the first all-girls lacrosse team in Regina, Saskatchewan.

== Personal life ==
Shattler's mother, Donna Lewis Babstock, is Ojibwa from Wiikwemkoong Unceded Territory. His father is Inuit, originally from northern Quebec. He is the second eldest of five siblings, having one older sister, three younger sisters

Shattler played junior ice hockey with the Brampton Capitals of the Ontario Junior Hockey League in the 2003–04 and 2004–05 seasons and was offered a scholarship to play NCAA Division I hockey at Cornell. After a long talk with his sister, Cindy Shattler, he decided to focus exclusively on sport rather than pursue collegiate athletics and felt that lacrosse offered him better opportunities. He has called Cindy the most positive influence on him as a lacrosse player. Beginning early in his playing career, his maternal grandmother, Gene Waseigijig, encouraged him to play for “a native team” and he has cited her as one of the reasons he chose to compete internationally with the Iroquois Nationals rather than with the Canadian national team. One of his younger sisters, Kelly Babstock, plays ice hockey with the Metropolitan Riveters of the NWHL.

Shattler resides in Regina, Saskatchewan, with his wife, Lindsay, and their children, Ava and Jace and Jax. He is currently working with several First Nation communities across the province, spreading his love for the game, focusing the majority of his time wirh Standing Buffalo First Nation and Ochapowace First Nation.
