= Chet Koneczny =

Canadian lacrosse player

Personal information
- Nationality: Canadian/Czech
- Born: May 9, 1984 (age 42) Truro, Nova Scotia, Canada
- Height: 5 ft 11 in (180 cm)
- Weight: 180 lb (82 kg; 12 st 12 lb)

Sport
- Position: Transition
- Shoots: Left
- NLL draft: 33rd overall, 2005; Toronto Rock
- NLL team Former teams: Halifax Thunderbirds; Philadelphia Wings; Orlando Titans; Colorado Mammoth; Washington Stealth
- WLA team: Victoria Shamrocks
- Pro career: 2010–

Chet Koneczny (born May 9, 1984) is a Czech Canadian professional box lacrosse player for the Halifax Thunderbirds in the National Lacrosse League.

== Professional career ==
Koneczny was a third round draft pick of the Toronto Rock in the 2004 NLL Entry Draft. Spent time on the Rock's practice squad in 2005 and 2006. Attended training camp with Toronto in 2009. Signed by the Orlando Titans as an unrestricted free agent prior to the start of 2010 training camp. Selected by the Washington Stealth in the first round (10th overall) of the Orlando Titans Dispersal Draft. On August 13, 2012, Koneczny signed as an unrestricted free agent to a one-year agreement with the Colorado Mammoth of the NLL.

== International career ==
Koneczny played for Czech Republic in field lacrosse on 2010 World Lacrosse Championship, as well as in box lacrosse on 2011 FIL World Indoor Lacrosse Championship. He once again represented the Czech Republic at the 2019 World Indoor Lacrosse Championship, recording five points in eight total games.

== Statistics ==
=== NLL ===
Statistics are as of December 18, 2018.

| | | Regular Season | | | | | | Playoffs |
| Season | Team | GP | G | A | Pts | LB | PIM | GP | G | A | Pts | LB | PIM |
|---|---|---|---|---|---|---|---|---|---|---|---|---|---|
| 2010 | Orlando | 16 | 2 | 12 | 14 | 78 | 25 | 2 | 0 | 1 | 1 | 15 | 0 |
| 2011 | Washington | 4 | 0 | 0 | 0 | 16 | 2 | 0 | 0 | 0 | 0 | 0 | 0 |
| 2012 | Washington | 1 | 0 | 0 | 0 | 5 | 0 | 0 | 0 | 0 | 0 | 0 | 0 |
| 2013 | Colorado | 10 | 0 | 3 | 3 | 45 | 54 | 1 | 0 | 0 | 0 | 9 | 0 |
| 2014 | Colorado | 11 | 0 | 5 | 5 | 47 | 12 | 1 | 0 | 1 | 1 | 1 | 2 |
| 2019 | Philadelphia | 1 | 0 | 0 | 0 | 4 | 19 |
| NLL totals | | 43 | 2 | 20 | 22 | 195 | 112 | 4 | 0 | 2 | 2 | 25 | 2 |
