= United States women's national indoor lacrosse team =

- Association: US Lacrosse
- Head coach: Ginny Capicchioni
- Website: www.usalacrosse.com/us-womens-box
Medal record
Box World Championships
Gold medal – first place	2024 Utica

The United States women's national indoor lacrosse team represents the U.S. in box lacrosse at the World Lacrosse Box Championships.

The 23 players selected will represent the United States at the 2024 World Championships in Utica, N.Y. from 20 to 29, September.

== Team records ==
=== Box World Championships ===
World Lacrosse Box Championships record
Year	Result	Matches	Wins	Draws	Losses	PF	PA	Coach
(United States) 2024	Champions	7	7	0	0	165	21	
Total	1/1	7	7	0	0	165	21	—

== Team roster ==
The roster for the 2024 World Lacrosse Box Championships was announced on August 29, 2024.

Name	Position	Team
Erin Bakes	Runners	
Abby Bosco	Runners	
Kristen Carr	Runners	
Marge Donovan	Runners	
Riley Ewing	Runners	
Molly Garrett	Runners	
Emily Hawryschuk	Runners	
Ally Kennedy	Runners	
Ally Mastroianni	Runners	
Charlotte North	Runners	
Helen Park	Runners	
Livy Rosenzweig	Runners	
Melissa Sconone	Runners	
Sam Swart	Runners	
Courtney Taylor	Runners	
Taylor VanThof	Runners	
Caroline Wakefield	Runners	
Tianna Wallpher	Runners	
Cece Webb	Runners	
Kayla Wood	Runners	
Ingrid Boyum	Goalies	
Madison Doucette	Goalies	
Taylor Moreno	Goalies	
