= Casey Powell =

American lacrosse player (born 1976)

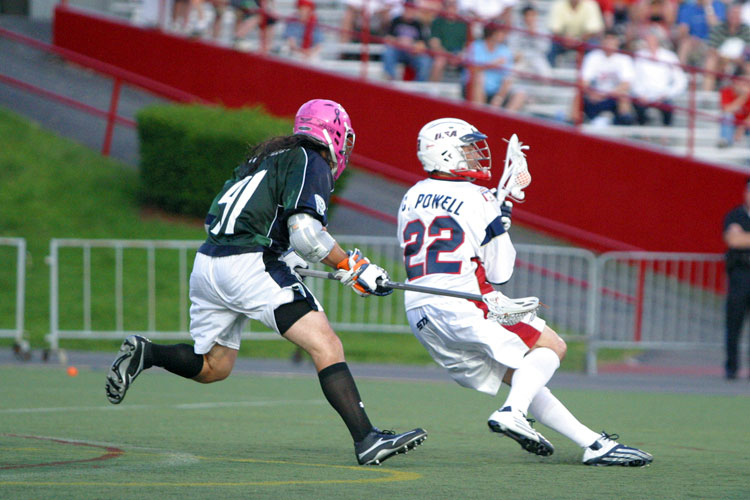
- Powell (right) with Team USA at the 2006 World Lacrosse Championship

Personal information
- Nickname: CP
- Born: February 18, 1976 (age 50) West Carthage, New York, U.S.
- Height: 6 ft 2 in (188 cm)
- Weight: 195 lb (88 kg; 13 st 13 lb)
- Website: www.caseypowell.com

Sport
- Position: Midfield / Attack / Forward
- Shoots: Both
- NCAA team: Syracuse University (1998)
- NLL draft: 1st overall, 1998; Rochester Knighthawks
- NLL teams: Colorado Mammoth; Boston Blazers; Orlando Titans; New York Titans; Anaheim Storm; Rochester Knighthawks
- MLL teams: Florida Launch; Chesapeake Bayhawks; Hamilton Nationals; Rochester Rattlers; Long Island Lizards
- Pro career: 1999–2016
- U.S. Lacrosse Hall of Fame, 2017; NLL Hall of Fame, 2021; Professional Lacrosse Hall of Fame, 2022
Medal record
Representing United States
Field lacrosse
World Lacrosse Championship
Silver medal – second place	2006 England
Box lacrosse
World Indoor Lacrosse Championship
Bronze medal – third place	2011 Czech Republic
Bronze medal – third place	2015 Onondaga Nation

Casey Powell (born February 18, 1976) is an American retired professional lacrosse player from West Carthage, New York. In 1998, he graduated from Syracuse University, where he was a four-time USILA All-American. Powell was the NCAA Division I Most Outstanding Player in 1997 and 1998. Powell was inducted into the National Lacrosse Hall of Fame in 2017, and the Professional Lacrosse Hall of Fame in 2022. He is widely regarded as one of the greatest lacrosse players of all time, and has been referred to as the greatest all-around attackman of his generation.

Powell played in Major League Lacrosse, the semi-professional field lacrosse league, from its first year in 2001 through 2016, although he played in only 8 games between 2009 and 2013. Yet Powell ranks sixth in goals (243), second in assists (237), and third in points (484) on the MLL career totals list as of 2017. Powell also tops the all-time MLL playoff point chart with 40. In 2005 and 2014, he won the MLL Offensive Player of the Year award. Powell earned the MVP award in 2014 at age 38. After retiring from professional lacrosse, Powell shifted focus to other business and philanthropic endeavors. Powell started the World Lacrosse Foundation, a non-profit organization for the advancement of lacrosse in 2015. He is a founder of Speed Lacrosse, a modified version of the sport. His younger brothers, Ryan and Mikey, were also lacrosse stars at Syracuse; all wore jersey #22.

== Syracuse University ==
Powell was a three-time first-team All-American attackman and midfielder, and helped Syracuse win the 1995 NCAA National Championship. Powell is the only player in NCAA Division I lacrosse history to earn first-team All-American honors at more than one position. He even won Most Outstanding Player at two positions, midfield in 1996 and attack in 1998. Powell followed Gary Gait in wearing the revered number 22 jersey at Syracuse University. His two younger brothers, Ryan and Mikey, carried on the tradition as well.

== Major League Lacrosse ==
In 2001, Powell was signed by the Long Island Lizards of Major League Lacrosse (MLL), and led the Lizards to the first-ever MLL Championship. Before the 2003 season, the Lizards traded Powell to the Rochester Rattlers in a five-player deal. During the 2004 season, Powell finished second on the Rattlers with 57 points (32 goals, 24 assists, 1 two-point goal). 2005 was a career year for Powell. He led the Rattlers in scoring and ranked second in the league with 57 points (27 goals, 30 assists). His 30 assists were second in the league behind Conor Gill's 34, and was named Offensive Player of the Week three times in the final four weeks of the season.

Casey and his brothers sat out the 2009 MLL season, as they did not report to their teams as of April 1 contract deadline. Powell returned in 2011, and played for the Hamilton Nationals.

During the 2011 season MLL Championship game, Powell injured his knee and needed to be helped off the field, he had 4 goals in a 10-9 Nationals loss to the Boston Cannons in the MLL championship game, his lacrosse future in doubt. But just days later he announced that an MRI revealed no tear in his ACL, so the injury was not as serious as first thought.

After playing only three games in the 2012 season, Powell retired from the MLL, but was drafted by Chesapeake Bayhawks in the supplemental draft that year. He returned in 2013 and played with the Bayhawks.

== National Lacrosse League ==
Powell was the first overall draft choice of the Rochester Knighthawks of the National Lacrosse League (NLL) in the 1998 entry draft and played two seasons for the Knighthawks. He was traded to the Buffalo Bandits in 2001 and signed a contract, but never reported. In 2003, the Bandits traded him to the Anaheim Storm. Powell led the Storm in scoring and was named to the All-Star team in both the 2004 and 2005 seasons.

The Storm suspended operations after the 2005 season, and Powell was chosen second overall by the Portland LumberJax, although he elected not to play in the 2006 season. In September 2006, Powell was traded yet again, this time to the expansion New York Titans, and was named to the All-Star team in 2007, 2008, and 2009. In the 2010 season, he was named the first American born MVP in NLL history. Following the contraction of the Titans in 2010, the Boston Blazers acquired Powell in a dispersal draft.

After one year in Boston, the Blazers also went dark, and Powell was chosen by the Rochester Knighthawks in the resulting dispersal draft.

Powell has also hosted a weekly one-hour show on Sirius Satellite Radio called "Inside the NLL with Casey Powell" since 2007.

Powell was named to the 2021 NLL Hall of Fame class.

== International ==
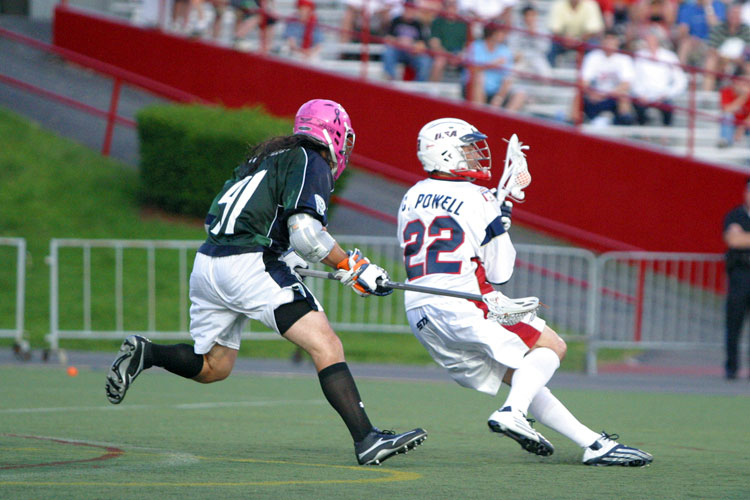
Casey Powell on Team USA vs. MLL All-Stars in 2006.

Powell captained the U.S. Men's National Team in the 2006 World Lacrosse Championship, winning the silver medal. He was also the captain of the U.S. Men's Indoor National Team in 2011, where he was named the tournament MVP. Powell was an assistant captain at the 2015 World Indoor Lacrosse Championship. The U.S. won bronze medals in both indoor championships.

== Honors and awards ==
- 1st Team All-American (1996, '97, '98)
- 2nd Team All-American (1995)
- Lt. Raymond Enners Award - Division I Most Outstanding Player (1997, '98)
- Jack Turnbull Award - Division I National Attackman of the Year (1998)
- McLaughlin Award - Division I National Midfielder of the Year (1996)
- Four-time NCAA All-Tournament team member (1995–98)
- MLL Offensive Player of the Year (2005)
- NLL Most Valuable Player (2010) - Powell is the only American player to be named NLL MVP
- MLL Offensive Player of the Year (2014)
- MLL Most Valuable Player (2014)
- Named to Lacrosse Magazine's All-Century Team
- LacrosseAllStars.com named Powell the #1 indoor/outdoor American lacrosse player to date (2014)
- National Lacrosse Hall of Fame (2017)
- National Lacrosse League Hall of Fame (2021)
- Professional Lacrosse Hall of Fame (2022)

=== Professional Lacrosse Hall of Fame ===
On June 18, 2022, Powell was inducted into the Professional Lacrosse Hall of Fame as one of the eleven members of the inaugural class of inductees.

== Career statistics ==
=== NCAA ===
Season	Team	GP	G	A	Pts	GB	Sh
1995	Syracuse	15	39	28	67	51	120
1996	Syracuse	15	32	27	59	75	103
1997	Syracuse	14	43	40	83	82	132
1998	Syracuse	14	44	34	78	66	126
NCAA Totals		58	158	129	287	274	481

Powell led the country in points and points per game in 1997 (83, 5.93) and 1998 (78, 5.57). 287 career points is tied for 14th all-time with his brother, Ryan Powell.

=== NLL ===
		Regular Season						Playoffs
Season	Team	GP	G	A	Pts	LB	PIM	GP	G	A	Pts	LB	PIM
1999	Rochester	9	9	21	30	41	6	2	1	1	2	7	0
2000	Rochester	10	12	16	28	47	8	2	3	4	7	9	0
2004	Anaheim	15	27	41	68	82	14	--	--	--	--	--	--
2005	Anaheim	14	27	30	57	60	20	--	--	--	--	--	--
2007	New York	13	29	51	80	90	22	--	--	--	--	--	--
2008	New York	16	32	54	86	79	10	2	6	7	13	7	2
2009	New York	13	40	45	85	59	16	3	10	11	21	16	6
2010	Orlando	14	44	36	80	53	12	2	6	4	10	3	0
2011	Boston	15	34	47	81	59	10	1	4	2	6	2	0
2013	Rochester; Colorado	13	17	37	54	45	8	1	3	3	6	2	1
2014	Colorado	5	8	17	25	14	6	--	--	--	--	--	--
NLL totals		137	279	395	674	629	132	13	33	32	65	46	9

=== MLL ===
		Regular Season							Playoffs
Season	Team	GP	G	2ptG	A	Pts	GB	PIM	GP	G	2ptG	A	Pts	GB	PIM
2001	Long Island	14	30	1	22	53	28	5	2	4	0	4	8	0	0
2002	Long Island	14	37	1	30	68	51	1	2	2	0	5	7	0	0
2003	Rochester	7	17	1	15	33	31	5	-	-	-	-	-	-	-
2004	Rochester	11	30	1	22	53	37	5.5	1	2	0	1	3	0	0
2005	Rochester	10	26	0	30	56	22	2	1	2	0	1	3	0	0
2007	Rochester	8	19	0	22	41	14	2	1	0	0	1	1	0	0.5
2008	Rochester	12	15	1	26	42	19	1.5	2	2	0	3	5	1	0
2011	Hamilton	2	2	0	3	5	0	1	2	5	0	3	8	6	0
2012	Hamilton	3	4	0	2	6	4	9.5	-	-	-	-	-	-	-
2013	Chesapeake	3	4	0	2	6	0	0	2	2	0	3	5	1	0
2014	Florida	14	30	0	33	63	18	7	-	-	-	-	-	-	-
2015	Florida	10	18	0	16	34	9	0	-	-	-	-	-	-	-
2016	Florida	9	11	0	12	23	15	1.5	-	-	-	-	-	-	-
MLL Totals		117	243	5	237	484	248	41	13	19	0	21	40	9	0.5

=== Canadian Lacrosse Association ===
			Regular Season					Playoffs
Season	Team	League	GP	G	A	Pts	PIM	GP	G	A	Pts	PIM
1994	Toronto Beaches	OLA Jr.A	8	14	15	29	0	5	11	5	16	7
2008	Six Nations Chiefs	MSL	5	5	8	13	0	0	0	0	0	0
Junior A Totals			8	14	15	29	0	5	11	5	16	7
Senior A Totals			5	5	8	13	0	0	0	0	0	0

== See also ==
- 1995 NCAA Division I Men's Lacrosse Championship
- List of family relations in the National Lacrosse League
- Mike Powell
- Ryan Powell
- Syracuse Orange men's lacrosse

Preceded by Dan Dawson	NLL Most Valuable Player; 2010	Succeeded by Jeff Shattler
