= England Lacrosse =

Sports governing body in England

- Sport: Lacrosse
- Jurisdiction: England
- Founded: 1892
- Affiliation: World Lacrosse, ELF
- Headquarters: Manchester, United Kingdom
- Chairperson: Vicky Lowe
- CEO: Mark Coups
- Men's coach: Sam Patterson
- Women's coach: Michael Molster

Official website
- englandlacrosse.co.uk
- (England)

English Lacrosse Association Ltd., also known as simply England Lacrosse, is the national governing body for lacrosse in England. The sport is managed through the Men's and Women's Playing Committees and the leagues administered by region: the South of England Men's Lacrosse Association (SEMLA), North of England Men's Lacrosse Association (NEMLA), South East Women's Lacrosse Association (SEWLA), South West Women's Lacrosse Association (SWWLA), and North Women's Lacrosse Association (NWLA). The England Lacrosse CEO is Mark Coups.

== History ==
The governing body was formed in 1892, as the English Lacrosse Union (ELU). In 1996, under the guidance of Sport England, the ELU and All England Women's Lacrosse Association joined together to form one national governing body, the English Lacrosse Association (ELA). The current constitution of the ELA came into effect in 1997.

== International competition ==
England participates in all World Lacrosse competitions. All aspects of the national team programs are overseen by the Men's and Women's playing committees, in conjunction with the respective England National Team committees.

Men's

The England men's national team have contested every World Lacrosse Championship since 1967, earning a silver medal in 1974. The last world championship to be held in England was the 2010 World Lacrosse Championship, in Manchester, England, where they placed 5th. The men's team have competed in the European Lacrosse Championships since 1995 and have won nine gold medals. This is every European tournament except a silver at 2001 in Cardiff.

Women's

The England women's national lacrosse team have played in every Women's Lacrosse World Cup since 1982, and earned silver medals in both the 1989 and 1993 tournaments. The most recent World Cup was held in 2017 in Guildford, Surrey, where the team received a bronze medal. The women's team have competed in the European Lacrosse Championships since 1996 and have won seven gold medals, three silver medals, and one bronze medal. The 2019 edition of the Women's European Lacrosse Championship took place in Netanya, Israel, where England secured a third successive gold medal.

U19 teams

Both men's and women's national teams have Under-19 teams, they compete in the Under-19 World Lacrosse Championships. The next Men's U-19 world championship will be held in Ireland in 2020. The women's team competed in the 2015 FIL Women's U-19 World Lacrosse Championship where they placed 3rd. Most recently, the men's team competed in, and won, the inaugural Under-20 European Championships in Prague, Czech Republic, beating Germany 9-8.

Indoor

England have competed in four World Indoor Lacrosse Championship tournaments: 2007 in Halifax, Canada, 2011 in Prague, Czech Republic, 2015 in Onondaga Nation, and 2019 in Langley, Canada. In 2019 England equalled their best result of 4th after narrowly losing 8-11 to the United States in a repeat of their 2007 bronze medal match.

England participated in the inaugural European Box Lacrosse Championship in Turku, Finland in 2017 finishing 5th. England then won gold at the following Championship in 2022, defeating Germany 11-8 in the final in Hannover.

== See also ==
- Lacrosse in England
