= Kyle Ross =

Canadian lacrosse player

Personal information
- Nationality: Canadian; Czech
- Born: May 12, 1983 (age 42) New Westminster, British Columbia, Canada
- Height: 6 ft 3 in (191 cm)
- Weight: 190 lb (86 kg; 13 st 8 lb)

Sport
- Position: Defense
- Shoots: Right
- NLL draft: 44th overall, 2004; Minnesota Swarm
- NLL teams: Washington Stealth; Toronto Rock; Boston Blazers; Minnesota Swarm
- WLA team: New Westminster Salmonbellies
- Pro career: 2007–2012

Kyle Ross (born May 12, 1983) was a professional box lacrosse player for the Washington Stealth, Toronto Rock, Boston Blazers and Minnesota Swarm in the National Lacrosse League. Ross was drafted 44th overall in the 2004 NLL draft. He stopped playing after the 2012 season. Internationally, he represented the Czech Republic at the 2007, 2011, and 2015 World Indoor Lacrosse Championships.

== Statistics ==
		Regular Season						Playoffs
Season	Team	GP	G	A	Pts	LB	PIM	GP	G	A	Pts	LB	PIM
2007	Minnesota	2	0	1	1	6	2	1	1	0	1	3	0
2008	Minnesota	13	3	6	9	77	26	--	--	--	--	--	--
2009	Boston	16	2	7	9	92	53	1	0	0	0	2	6
2010	Boston	16	4	10	14	85	58	1	0	0	0	2	0
2011	Toronto	15	1	3	4	55	29	3	0	2	2	5	7
2012	Washington	12	2	1	3	6	8	--	--	--	--	--	--
	NLL totals	74	12	28	40	321	176	6	1	2	3	12	13
