= 2015 World Indoor Lacrosse Championship =

Tournament details
- Host country: Iroquois
- Venues: 4 (in 2 host cities)
- Dates: September 18–27, 2015
- Teams: 13

Final positions
- Champions: Canada (4th title)
- Runners-up: Haudenosaunee
- Third place: United States
- Fourth place: Israel

Tournament statistics
- Games played: 46
- Goals scored: 1,075 (23.37 per game)
- Attendance: 10,421 (227 per game)
- Scoring leader(s): (Turkey) Anthony Terranova (67 pts)

Awards
- MVP: (Canada) Shawn Evans

Official website
- worldlacrosse.sport/wilc-2015/

The 2015 World Indoor Lacrosse Championship (WILC) was the fourth international box lacrosse championship organized by the Federation of International Lacrosse every four years. The 2015 WILC was hosted by the Onondaga Nation in the United States, south of Syracuse, New York, and took place between September 18 and 27. Canada defeated the host Iroquois Nationals 12–8 in the gold medal game, the same finals match-up featured in the first three indoor championships. Since the WILC started in 2003, Team Canada is undefeated with an overall record of 23–0.

In the bronze medal game, the United States beat first-time participant Israel 15–4. Canadian Shawn Evans was the tournament MVP, scoring 10 goals and 25 assists in 5 games.

Thirteen countries participated, 5 more than in 2011, including first-time competitors Finland, Germany, Israel, Serbia, Switzerland, and Turkey. Most games were held on the Onondaga Nation at the Onondaga Nation Arena and the newly built $6.5 million Onondaga Nation Fieldhouse, although the Iroquois' games versus Canada and the United States were held at War Memorial Arena in Syracuse. Over 10,000 fans attended the gold and bronze medal games in the Carrier Dome.

The opening ceremonies in the sold-out War Memorial Arena featured a light show about the Haudenosaunee creation story and traditional dancing. After the Iroquois Nationals were not allowed to use their Haudenosaunee passports to travel to England in 2010 due to new security requirements, many international players were interested in getting their passports stamped by the Onondaga Nation. The documentary Spirit Game: Pride of a Nation explains the meaning of lacrosse to the Iroquois people and covers the Iroquois Nationals in the 2015 WILC, featuring brothers Lyle and Miles Thompson.

== Venues ==
Onondaga Reservation	Syracuse	Host sites of the 2015 WILC
Tsha'Hon'nonyen'dakhwa (Onondaga Nation Arena); Capacity: 3,000; 42°57′58″N 76°8′22″W	Carrier Dome; Capacity: 28,000; 43°2′10″N 76°8′11″W	Host sites of the 2015 WILC
Tsha' Thoñ'nhes (Onondaga Nation Fieldhouse); Capacity: 300; 42°56′48″N 76°09′17″W	War Memorial Arena; Capacity: 6,000; 43°2′41″N 76°8′54″W	Host sites of the 2015 WILC

== Pool play ==
The teams were divided into 3 divisions, with the 5 highest-ranked teams placed in the Blue Division and the others being split into the Red and Green Divisions. In the Blue Division, the top two teams advanced to the semifinals, the third and fourth teams entered the quarterfinals and the fifth team was placed in the classification bracket. The top two teams in both the Red and Green Divisions entered the play-in games, while the bottom two teams were placed in the classification bracket.

=== Blue Division ===
Canada once again was undefeated in pool play, although the game versus the Iroquois was hard-fought. The Nationals led 8–4 early in the third period, but Canada outscored them 7–1 the rest of the game.

Team	GP	W	L	GF	GA	DIF	Advanced to
Canada	4	4	0	67	20	+47	Semifinals
Haudenosaunee	4	3	1	59	30	+29	Semifinals
United States	4	2	2	43	47	-4	Quarterfinals
Czech Republic	4	1	3	22	57	-35	Quarterfinals
England	4	0	4	24	61	-37	Classification bracket

September 18	Haudenosaunee	13–9	United States

September 19	Czech Republic	9–7	England

September 20	United States	14–7	Czech Republic

September 20	Haudenosaunee	9–11	Canada

September 21	United States	13–9	England

September 21	Canada	19–2	Czech Republic

September 22	England	6–20	Haudenosaunee

September 22	Canada	18–7	United States

September 23	England	2–19	Canada

September 23	Czech Republic	4–17	Haudenosaunee

=== Red Division ===
Team	GP	W	L	GF	GA	DIF	Advanced to
Australia	3	3	0	49	29	+20	Play-in games
Finland	3	2	1	37	22	+15	Play-in games
Turkey	3	1	2	39	40	-1	Classification bracket
Switzerland	3	0	3	17	51	-34	Classification bracket

September 18	Switzerland	6–12	Turkey

September 18	Australia	7–6	Finland

September 19	Finland	18–5	Switzerland

September 19	Turkey	17–21	Australia

September 20	Switzerland	6–21	Australia

September 20	Finland	13–10	Turkey

=== Green Division ===
Team	GP	W	L	GF	GA	DIF	Advanced to
Israel	3	2	1	36	24	+12	Play-in games
(Republic of Ireland) Ireland	3	2	1	27	29	-2	Play-in games
Serbia	3	1	2	29	36	-7	Classification bracket
Germany	3	1	2	27	30	-3	Classification bracket

September 18	Israel (Israel)	15–8	Serbia

September 18	Ireland (Republic of Ireland)	10–7	Germany

September 19	Serbia	10–11	(Republic of Ireland) Ireland

September 19	Germany	10–9	Israel

September 20	Israel	12–6	(Republic of Ireland) Ireland

September 20	Germany	10–11	Serbia

== Play-in games ==
September 21	Israel	14–4	Finland

September 21	Australia	4–12	(Republic of Ireland) Ireland

September 22	Ireland (Republic of Ireland)	7–12	Israel

Israel was seeded #5 and Ireland #6 in the quarterfinals. Finland and Australia were placed in the classification bracket.

== Championship bracket ==
The gold medal game was close throughout the first half, with only two brief two-goal leads for Canada. Canada led 6–5 at the half, then the teams traded two-goal runs to get back to 8–7 in the early fourth quarter. Steven Priolo and Stephan Leblanc both scored in unsettled situations within a minute of each other for Canada to take command of the game with 10 minutes left.

Team Canada's Curtis Dickson led all scorers with four goals, including one open-net goal, and an assist. His teammate Mark Matthews had four assists. Randy Staats and Johnny Powless both had four points for the Iroquois.

Quarterfinals; September 24
Israel	13
Czech Republic	12
United States	22
(Republic of Ireland) Ireland	2

Semifinals; September 25
Canada	19
Israel	3
Haudenosaunee	17
United States	10

Gold medal game September 27
Canada	12
Haudenosaunee	8
Bronze medal game
United States	15
Israel	4

== Classification bracket ==
September 21	Serbia	9–7	Switzerland

September 21	Turkey	21–16	Germany

September 22	Finland	8–12	Australia

September 22	Turkey	12–16	Serbia

September 22	Germany	16–8	Switzerland

September 24	Serbia	13–17	Australia

September 24	Turkey	15–12	Switzerland

September 25	Finland	11–9	Germany

September 25	Turkey	25–18	Serbia

September 25	England	13–12	Australia

September 25	Czech Republic	13–14	(Republic of Ireland) Ireland

September 26	Ireland (Republic of Ireland)	12–14	England	5th place

September 26	Australia	11–20	Czech Republic	7th place

September 26	Finland	24–6	Turkey	9th place

September 26	Serbia	12–13	Germany	11th place

== Ranking, leaders, and awards ==
=== Final ranking ===
1st place, gold medalist(s)	Canada
2nd place, silver medalist(s)	Haudenosaunee
3rd place, bronze medalist(s)	United States
4	Israel
5	England
6	(Republic of Ireland) Ireland
7	Czech Republic
8	Australia
9	Finland
10	Turkey
11	Germany
12	Serbia
13	Switzerland

=== Scoring leaders ===
Player	G	A	Pts
(Turkey) Anthony Terranova	42	25	67
(Turkey) Dave Deriso	34	17	51
(United States) Joe Walters	14	30	44
(Finland) Roope Jokela	22	20	42
(Turkey) Joseph Rainoldi	25	16	41
(Australia) Caleb Hall	21	19	40
(Republic of Ireland) Stephen Keogh	19	21	40
(Australia) Matthew Taylor	23	15	38
(Israel) Chad Culp	12	25	37
(Finland) Robert Raittila	19	16	35

=== Goaltending leaders ===
Player	GP	SV	GA	Sv%
(Canada) Matt Vinc	6	91	16	85%
(Haudenosaunee) Angus Goodleaf	6	178	48	79%
(Republic of Ireland) Micahel Cregan	8	319	90	78%
(England) Nick Rose	6	275	80	77%
(Finland) Lauri Uusitalo	7	176	54	77%
(Israel) Zachary Higgins	8	231	70	77%
(Turkey) Scott Komer	8	300	92	77%
Minimum 75 saves. Source:

=== All World Team ===
Forwards

(Haudenosaunee) Lyle Thompson
(Canada) Mark Matthews

Transition

(Haudenosaunee) Jeff Shattler

Defense

(Haudenosaunee) Sid Smith
(Canada) Chris Corbell

Goaltender

(Canada) Matt Vinc

Most Valuable Player

(Canada) Shawn Evans
