= Haudenosaunee national indoor lacrosse team =

National box lacrosse team representing the Haudenosaunee

Haudenosaunee Confederacy
- Nickname(s): Haudenosaunee Nationals
- WL membership: 1987
- Association: First Nations Lacrosse Association

World Indoor Championship
- Appearances: 6 (first in 2003)
- Best result: Second place (2003, 2007, 2011, 2015, 2019)
- Website: haudenosauneenationals.com
Medal record
World Indoor Lacrosse Championship
Silver medal – second place	2003 Canada
Silver medal – second place	2007 Canada
Silver medal – second place	2011 Czech Republic
Silver medal – second place	2015 Onondaga Nation
Silver medal – second place	2019 Canada
Bronze medal – third place	2024 United States
Heritage Cup
Second place	2013 Canada

The Haudenosaunee Nationals Indoor Lacrosse Team, known as the Haudenosaunee Nationals, represents the Haudenosaunee Confederacy in international box lacrosse competitions. They are currently ranked second in the world by World Lacrosse and have won silver medals in five of the six World Indoor Lacrosse Championships. The team is organized by the First Nations Lacrosse Association.

In June 2022, the Nationals dropped Iroquois from their name, adopting the name the Haudenosaunee Nationals.

== World Indoor Lacrosse Championship ==
=== Overall results ===
World Indoor Lacrosse Championship
Year	Host	GP	W	L	GF	GA	Finish
2003	Canada	7	5	2	126	81	2nd place, silver medalist(s)
2007	Canada	5	4	1	98	35	2nd place, silver medalist(s)
2011	Czech Republic	5	4	1	84	37	2nd place, silver medalist(s)
2015	Onondaga Nation	6	4	2	84	48	2nd place, silver medalist(s)
2019	Canada	6	4	2	81	66	2nd place, silver medalist(s)
2024	United States	6	3	3	86	54	3rd place, bronze medalist(s)
Totals	-	35	24	11	559	321	5 Silver Medals

=== 2003 ===
In the first World Indoor Lacrosse Championship, the Nationals only lost to Canada, but twice, a close 15–13 game in round-robin play and a blowout 21–4 loss in the championship. John Grant Jr. of Team Canada scored 7 goals and 2 assists in the final.

15 May 2003 2003 Preliminary	Haudenosaunee	19–12	Scotland	Oshawa
12:00 (UTC−04:00)				Stadium: Oshawa Civic Auditorium

16 May 2003 2003 Preliminary	Haudenosaunee	13–15	Canada	Oshawa
19:30 (UTC−04:00)				Stadium: Oshawa Civic Auditorium

18 May 2003 2003 Preliminary	Haudenosaunee	24–7	Australia	Mississauga
16:00 (UTC−04:00)				Stadium: Hershey Centre

19 May 2003 2003 Preliminary	Haudenosaunee	21–14	United States	Mississauga
19:30 (UTC−04:00)				Stadium: Hershey Centre

21 May 2003 2003 Preliminary	Haudenosaunee	23–4	Czech Republic	Kitchener, Ontario
16:00 (UTC−04:00)				Stadium: Kitchener Memorial Auditorium

22 May 2003 2003 Semifinal	Haudenosaunee	22–8	Scotland	Kitchener, Ontario
19:30 (UTC−04:00)				Stadium: Kitchener Memorial Auditorium

24 May 2003 2003 Gold Medal	Haudenosaunee	4–21	Canada	Hamilton, Ontario
13:30 (UTC−04:00)				Stadium: Copps Coliseum; Attendance: 7,132

2003 WILC roster
Name	Position
Mike Benedict	Forward
Cory Bomberry	Forward
Tony Henderson	Forward
Veron Hill	Forward
Duane Jacobs	Forward
Kyle Jamieson	Forward
J.D. Jones	Forward
Rich Kilgour	Forward
Michael Longboat	Forward
Tom Montour	Forward
Delby Powless	Forward
Neal Powless	Forward
Percy Shenandoah	Forward
Kim Squire	Forward
Mike Stevens	Forward
Marshall Abrams	Defense
Cam Bomberry	Defense
Tim Bomberry	Defense
Mark Burnam	Defense
Ron Cogan	Defense
Ryan Davis	Defense
Bob Henry	Defense
Robert Henry	Defense
Clay Hill	Defense
Allen Jones	Defense
Ricky Oakes	Defense
Brian Stevens	Defense
Derek General	Goaltender
Ken Montour	Goaltender
Mike Thompson	Goaltender
Darris Kilgour	Head coach

=== 2007 ===
The 2007 WILC final, with the expected pairing of Canada against the Nationals, was one of the best games in box lacrosse history. Team Canada went through the first quarter with a 4–2 lead, then the Nationals were able to come back in the second and third. The Iroquois were up 10–9 at the start of the fourth quarter. Three quick Canadian goals put them in front again, but they were answered by another three goals by the Nationals. Then John Grant, Jr. scored two goals and the victory for Canada was almost secured. But Dean Hill scored in the final minute of regulation to tie it at 14, sending the championship into overtime. Thirty seconds into overtime, Jeff Zywicki scored his first goal of the game, making it 15–14 for Canada's second gold medal.

14 May 2007 2007 Preliminary	Haudenosaunee	27–8	England	Halifax, Nova Scotia
13:00 (UTC−03:00)				Stadium: Halifax Metro Centre

15 May 2007 2007 Preliminary	Haudenosaunee	24–4	Czech Republic	Halifax, Nova Scotia
20:00 (UTC−03:00)				Stadium: Halifax Metro Centre

16 May 2007 2007 Preliminary	Haudenosaunee	19–4	Scotland	Halifax, Nova Scotia
17:00 (UTC−03:00)				Stadium: Halifax Metro Centre

19 May 2007 2007 Semifinal	Haudenosaunee	14–4	United States	Halifax, Nova Scotia
				Stadium: Halifax Metro Centre

20 May 2007 2007 Gold Medal	Haudenosaunee	14–15	Canada	Halifax, Nova Scotia
				Stadium: Halifax Metro Centre

=== 2011 ===
Canada beat the Nationals in the final for the third time in 2011. Starting goaltender Mike Thompson was injured in the second quarter and had to be replaced by Angus Goodleaf. Cody Jamieson and Sid Smith and were named to the All World Team. Roger Vyse lead the team in scoring with 15 goals and 9 assists.

21 May 2011 2011 Preliminary	Haudenosaunee	23–3	Ireland	Prague (Czech Republic)
10:00 (UTC+02:00)		Report		Stadium: Eden Arena

22 May 2011 2011 Preliminary	Haudenosaunee	25–5	Czech Republic	Prague (Czech Republic)
19:00 (UTC+02:00)		Report		Stadium: Eden Arena

23 May 2011 2011 Preliminary	Haudenosaunee	11–10	United States	Prague (Czech Republic)
19:00 (UTC+02:00)		Report		Stadium: Eden Arena

27 May 2011 2011 Semifinal	Haudenosaunee	19–6	Czech Republic	Prague (Czech Republic)
19:00 (UTC+02:00)		Report		Stadium: Eden Arena

28 May 2011 2011 Gold Medal	Haudenosaunee	6–13	Canada	Prague (Czech Republic)
19:00 (UTC+02:00)		Report		Stadium: Eden Arena

2011 WILC roster
Jersey	Name
	Seth Blue Hill
72	Cory Bomberry
26	Brett Bucktooth
48	Ronald Cogan
84	Thomas Francis
55	Angus Goodleaf
73	Dean Hill
9	Stewart Hill
47	Travis Hill
23	Peter Jacobs
85	Cody Jamieson
19	Manuel Johnson
11	Isaiah Kicknosway
65	Michael Lazore
63	Thomas Montour
33	Jeffery Powless
21	Andy Secore
77	Jeff Shattler
79	Sid Smith
17	Brandon Swamp
66	Mike Thompson
41	Holden Vyse
81	Roger Vyse

=== 2015 ===
The 2015 World Indoor Lacrosse Championship was hosted by the Onondaga Nation, south of Syracuse, New York. Canada defeated the host Iroquois Nationals 12–8 in the gold medal game, the same finals match-up featured in all four indoor championships.

Most games were held on the Onondaga Reservation at the Onondaga Nation Arena and the newly built $6.5 million Onondaga Nation Fieldhouse, although the Iroquois' games versus Canada and the United States were held at War Memorial Arena in Syracuse and the gold and bronze medal games were held at the Carrier Dome.

The opening ceremonies in the sold-out War Memorial Arena featured a light show about the Haudenosaunee creation story and traditional dancing. The documentary Spirit Game: Pride of a Nation explains the meaning of lacrosse to the Haudenosaunee and covers the Iroquois Nationals in the 2015 WILC, featuring brothers Lyle and Miles Thompson.

18 September 2015 2015 Preliminary	Haudenosaunee	13–9	United States	Syracuse, New York
20:30 (UTC−04:00)		Report		Stadium: Oncenter War Memorial Arena

20 September 2015 2015 Preliminary	Haudenosaunee	9–11	Canada	Syracuse, New York
17:00 (UTC−04:00)		Report		Stadium: Oncenter War Memorial Arena

22 September 2015 2015 Preliminary	Haudenosaunee	20–6	England	Onondaga Reservation (Haudenosaunee)
16:30 (UTC−04:00)		Report		Stadium: Onondaga Nation Arena

23 September 2015 2015 Preliminary	Haudenosaunee	17–4	Czech Republic	Onondaga Reservation (Haudenosaunee)
19:30 (UTC−04:00)		Report		Stadium: Onondaga Nation Arena

25 September 2015 2015 Semifinal	Haudenosaunee	17–10	United States	Onondaga Reservation (Haudenosaunee)
19:30 (UTC−04:00)		Report		Stadium: Onondaga Nation Arena

27 September 2015 2015 Gold Medal	Haudenosaunee	8–12	Canada	Syracuse, New York
16:00 (UTC−04:00)		Report		Stadium: Carrier Dome

2015 WILC roster
Jersey	Name	Nation
2	Miles Thompson	Onondaga Nation
4	Lyle Thompson	Onondaga Nation
9	Craig Point	Mohawk Nation
10	Adam Bomberry	Cayuga Nation
15	Tyler Garrison	Michel Band Nation
17	Brier Jonathan	Tuscarora Nation
22	Jerome Haina Thompson	Onondaga Nation
26	Brett Bucktooth	Onondaga Nation
55	Angus Goodleaf	Mohawk Nation
63	Tommy Montour	Mohawk Nation
66	Alex Kedoh Hill	Mohawk Nation
71	Brandon Goodwin	Wet'suwet'en Nation
74	Jeremy Thompson	Onondaga Nation
76	Warren Hill	Mohawk Nation
77	Jeff Shattler	Ojibwe Nation
79	Sid Smith	Cayuga Nation
81	Roger Vyse	Mohawk Nation
83	Randy Staats	Mohawk Nation
84	Josh Becker	Seneca Nation
89	Austin Staats	Mohawk Nation
93	Johnny Powless	Mohawk Nation
94	Wenster Green	Mohawk Nation
99	Mike Thompson	Mohawk Nation

=== 2019 ===
19 September 2019 2019 Preliminary	Haudenosaunee	17-6	Israel	Langley, British Columbia
16:30 (UTC−07:00)		Report		Stadium: Langley Events Centre

21 September 2019 2019 Preliminary	Haudenosaunee	12-10	United States	Langley, British Columbia
19:30 (UTC−07:00)		Report		Stadium: Langley Events Centre

22 September 2019 2019 Preliminary	Haudenosaunee	19-5	England	Langley, British Columbia
19:30 (UTC−07:00)		Report		Stadium: Langley Events Centre

23 September 2019 2019 Preliminary	Haudenosaunee	12-19	Canada	Langley, British Columbia
19:30 (UTC−07:00)		Report		Stadium: Langley Events Centre

26 September 2019 2019 Semifinals	Haudenosaunee	9-7	United States	Langley, British Columbia
17:00 (UTC−07:00)		Report		Stadium: Langley Events Centre

28 September 2019 2019 Gold Medal	Haudenosaunee	12-19	Canada	Langley, British Columbia
20:00 (UTC−07:00)		Report		Stadium: Langley Events Centre

=== Awards ===
Event	Member	Award
2011 WILC	Sid Smith	All World Team - Defense
2011 WILC	Cody Jamieson	All World Team - Transition
2015 WILC	Lyle Thompson	All World Team - Forward
2015 WILC	Jeff Shattler	All World Team - Transition
2015 WILC	Sid Smith	All World Team - Defense
2019 WILC	Cody Jamieson	Most Valuable Player
2019 WILC	Randy Staats	All World Team - Forward

== Other competitions ==
=== Bowhunters Cup ===
25 September 2010 2010	Haudenosaunee	11–13	United States	Syracuse, New York
				Stadium: Oncenter War Memorial Arena

16 October 2011 2011	Haudenosaunee	14–13	United States	Verona, New York
				Stadium: Turning Stone Resort & Casino

13 October 2012 2012	Haudenosaunee	12–10	United States	Rochester, New York
				Stadium: Blue Cross Arena

12 October 2013 2013	Haudenosaunee	24–11	United States	Six Nations of the Grand River
				Stadium: Iroquois Lacrosse Arena

2013 Bowhunter Cup roster
Cody Jamieson
Craig Point
Johnny Powless
Randy Staats
Jeremy Thompson
Roger Vyse
Dean Hill
Travis Hill
Alex Kedoh Hill
Tom Montour
Wenster Green
Joe Hall
Sid Smith
Vaughn Harris
Marty Hill
Rod Squire
Holdon Vyse
Warren Hill
Angus Goodleaf

=== Heritage Cup ===
17 November 2013 2013 Heritage Cup	Haudenosaunee	11–12	Canada	Montreal
				Stadium: Bell Centre

== Junior teams ==
During the 2015 WILC, the first FIL sanctioned under–17 box lacrosse friendly took place between the Iroquois Nationals and Team Canada. The under-17 squads again faced off prior to the 2017 Heritage Cup.

=== Other tournaments and games ===
16 November 2013 U17 Friendly	Haudenosaunee	8–13	Canada	Montreal
				Stadium: Bell Centre

26 September 2015 U17 Friendly	Haudenosaunee	8–13	Canada	Onondaga Reservation (Haudenosaunee)
				Stadium: Tsha’ Thoñ’nhes

27 September 2015 U17 Friendly	Haudenosaunee	7–12	Canada	Onondaga Reservation (Haudenosaunee)
				Stadium: Tsha’ Thoñ’nhes

21 October 2017 U17 Heritage Cup	Haudenosaunee	7–25	Canada	Hamilton, Ontario
				Stadium: FirstOntario Centre

== See also ==
- First Nations Lacrosse Association
- Haudenosaunee men's national lacrosse team
- Haudenosaunee women's national lacrosse team
- World Indoor Lacrosse Championship
