= 2019 World Indoor Lacrosse Championship =

Tournament details
- Host country: Canada
- Venue: Langley Events Centre (in Langley, British Columbia, Canada host cities)
- Dates: 19-28 September 2019
- Teams: 20

Final positions
- Champions: Canada (5th title)
- Runners-up: Haudenosaunee
- Third place: United States
- Fourth place: England

Tournament statistics
- Scoring leader(s): (Republic of Ireland) Brian Gillis (30 pts) (United States) Kieran McArdle (30 pts)

Awards
- MVP: (Haudenosaunee) Cody Jamieson

Official website
- www.wilc2019.ca

The 2019 World Indoor Lacrosse Championship (WILC) was the fifth international box lacrosse championship organized by World Lacrosse every four years. It was held 19-28 September 2019 at the Langley Events Centre in Langley, British Columbia, Canada. The winner of the WILC wins the Cockerton Cup, named for All-American lacrosse player Stan Cockerton.

== Venues ==
The competition was hosted in two venues in Langley, BC: Langley Events Centre and Aldergrove Credit Union Community Centre.

== Teams ==
A record 20 countries competed in the 2019 World Indoor Lacrosse Championships. New entrants included Hong Kong, Costa Rica, Mexico and the Netherlands.

- Australia
- Austria
- Canada
- Costa Rica
- Czech Republic
- England
- Finland
- Germany
- Hong Kong
- (Republic of Ireland) Ireland
- Haudenosaunee
- Israel
- Mexico
- Netherlands
- Serbia
- Scotland
- Slovakia
- Sweden
- Switzerland
- United States

== Pool play ==
The teams were divided into four divisions, with the five highest-ranked teams placed in the Blue Division and the others being split into the Yellow, Green, and Orange Divisions. In the Blue Division, the top two teams advanced to the semifinals, the third and fourth teams entered the quarterfinals and the fifth team was placed in the first round of the championship bracket. The first place teams in the Yellow, Green, and Orange Divisions entered the championship bracket, while the other teams were placed in the placement bracket.

The Canadians won the event, with Iroquois, United States, and England placing second, third, and fourth, respectively.

=== Blue Division ===
Team	GP	W	L	T	OTW	OTL	GF	GA	DIF	Advanced to
Canada	4	4	0	0	0	0	70	28	+42	Semifinals
Haudenosaunee	4	3	1	0	0	0	60	40	+20	Semifinals
United States	4	2	2	0	0	0	56	41	+15	Quarter-finals
Israel	4	0	3	0	1	0	29	59	-30	Quarter-finals
England	4	0	3	0	0	1	20	67	-47	Qualifier

September 19	Israel	6-17	Haudenosaunee

September 19	Canada	16-6	United States

September 20	United States	18-10	Israel

September 20	England	5-18	Canada

September 21	Israel	8-7 OT	England

September 21	Haudenosaunee	12-10	United States

September 22	England	5-19	Haudenosaunee

September 22	Canada	17-5	Israel

September 23	Haudenosaunee	12-19	Canada

September 23	United States	22-3	England

=== Yellow Division ===
Team	GP	W	L	GF	GA	DIF	Advanced to
Netherlands	4	3	1	52	40	+12	Qualifier
Serbia	4	3	1	50	41	+9	Placement
(Republic of Ireland) Ireland	4	3	1	54	29	+25	Placement
Hong Kong	4	1	3	45	70	-25	Placement
Switzerland	4	0	4	36	57	-21	Placement

September 19	Serbia	8—6	Switzerland

September 19	Ireland (Republic of Ireland)	8—11	Netherlands

September 20	Netherlands	9—11	Serbia

September 20	Ireland (Republic of Ireland)	18—2	Hong Kong

September 21	Switzerland	13—16	Hong Kong

September 21	Serbia	9—10	(Republic of Ireland) Ireland

September 22	Netherlands	15—10	Switzerland

September 22	Hong Kong	16—22	Serbia

September 23	Hong Kong	11—17	Netherlands

September 23	Switzerland	7—18	(Republic of Ireland) Ireland

=== Green Division ===
Team	GP	W	L	GF	GA	DIF	Advanced to
Czech Republic	4	4	0	68	21	+47	Qualifier
Germany	4	3	1	67	29	+38	Placement
Slovakia	4	2	2	51	56	-5	Placement
Scotland	4	1	3	46	60	-14	Placement
Mexico	4	0	4	26	92	-66	Placement

September 19	Slovakia	24—14	Scotland

September 19	Mexico	6—29	Czech Republic

September 20	Czech Republic	17—3	Slovakia

September 20	Mexico	6—25	Germany

September 21	Slovakia	18—7	Mexico

September 21	Germany	18—6	Scotland

September 22	Scotland	20—7	Mexico

September 22	Czech Republic	11—6	Germany

September 23	Germany	18—6	Slovakia

September 23	Scotland	6—11	Czech Republic

=== Orange Division ===
Team	GP	W	L	GF	GA	DIF	Advanced to
Finland	4	4	0	79	25	+54	Qualifier
Australia	4	3	1	68	32	+36	Placement
Austria	4	2	2	49	46	+3	Placement
Sweden	4	1	3	50	69	-19	Placement
Costa Rica	4	0	4	9	83	-74	Placement

September 19	Costa Rica	1—20	Australia

September 19	Finland	20—5	Austria

September 20	Sweden	6—23	Finland

September 20	Austria	18—0	Costa Rica

September 21	Austria	20—10	Sweden

September 21	Finland	15—10	Australia

September 22	Costa Rica	4—21	Finland

September 22	Australia	22—10	Sweden

September 23	Sweden	24—4	Costa Rica

September 23	Australia	16—6	Austria

== Championship Round ==
=== 1st-4th Placement ===
Qualifier
B5	England	15
O1	Finland	6
Y1	Netherlands	6
G1	Czech Republic	17

Quarter-finals
B1	Canada
Bye
B4	Israel	7
B5	England	9
B2	Haudenosaunee
Bye
B3	United States	17
G1	Czech Republic	3

Semifinals
B1	Canada	21
B5	England	4
B2	Haudenosaunee	9
B3	United States	7

Final
B1	Canada	19
B2	Haudenosaunee	12
Third place
B5	England	8
B3	United States	11

=== 5th-8th Placement ===
Semifinals
B4	Israel	22
Y1	Netherlands	7
G1	Czech Republic	9
O1	Finland	17

5th Place Game
B4	Israel	14
O1	Finland	9
7th Place Game
Y1	Netherlands	8
G1	Czech Republic	12

=== 9th-12th Placement ===
Qualifier
G4	Scotland	12
Y4	Hong Kong	10
G3	Slovakia	21
O5	Costa Rica	4
O4	Sweden	12
Y5	Switzerland	11
O3	Austria	11
G5	Mexico	10

Quarter-finals
O2	Australia	29
G4	Scotland	5
Y3	Ireland	13
G3	Slovakia	4
G2	Germany	17
O4	Sweden	10
Y2	Serbia	13
O3	Austria	11

Semifinals
O2	Australia	17
Y3	Ireland	11
G2	Germany	13
Y2	Serbia	8

9th Place
O2	Australia	13
G2	Germany	6
11th Place
Y3	Ireland	14
Y2	Serbia	9

=== 13th-16th Placement ===
Semifinals
G4	Scotland	12
G3	Slovakia	14
O4	Sweden	7
O3	Austria	12

13th Place Game
G3	Slovakia	16
O3	Austria	13
15th Place Game
G4	Scotland	9
O4	Sweden	18

=== 17th-20th Placement ===
Semifinals
Y4	Hong Kong	19
O5	Costa Rica	2
Y5	Switzerland	15
G5	Mexico	6

17th Place Game
Y4	Hong Kong	14
Y5	Switzerland	16
19th Place Game
O5	Costa Rica	11
G5	Mexico	14

== Ranking, leaders, and awards ==
=== Final ranking ===
1st place, gold medalist(s)	Canada
2nd place, silver medalist(s)	Haudenosaunee
3rd place, bronze medalist(s)	United States
4	England
5	Israel
6	Finland
7	Czech Republic
8	Netherlands
9	Australia
10	Germany
11	Ireland
12	Serbia
13	Slovakia
14	Austria
15	Sweden
16	Scotland
17	Switzerland
18	Hong Kong
19	Mexico
20	Costa Rica

=== Scoring leaders ===
Regular Season
Player	Team	GP	G	A	Pts
Brian Gillis	(Republic of Ireland)	4	16	14	30
Kieran McArdle	(United States)	4	10	20	30
Cole Paciejewski	(Scotland)	4	17	12	29
Cody Jamieson	(Haudenosaunee)	4	11	17	28
Joseph Resetarits	(United States)	4	8	20	28
Robert Raittila	(Finland)	3	15	13	28
Roope Jokela	(Finland)	3	4	24	28
Kevin Powers	(Sweden)	4	14	13	27
Luke Coppinger	(Republic of Ireland)	4	14	13	27
Gustav Weber	(Germany)	4	11	14	25
Iain Vickars	(Scotland)	4	14	11	25
Randy Staats	(Haudenosaunee)	4	9	16	25
Rintaro Fujita	(Austria)	4	10	15	25
Playoffs
Player	Team	GP	G	A	Pts
Matthew Taylor	(Australia)	3	18	13	31
Tristan Rai	(Australia)	3	7	20	27
Klaus Hauer	(Austria)	4	16	10	26
Thomas Johnson	(Sweden)	4	16	9	25
Jean-Luc Chetner	(Israel)	3	8	16	24
Kevin Powers	(Sweden)	4	16	8	24
Jesse Whinnen	(Australia)	3	12	10	22
Rintaro Fujita	(Austria)	4	11	11	22
Brian Gillis	(Republic of Ireland)	3	7	12	19
Connor Simon	(Mexico)	3	10	9	19
Ilija Gajic	(Serbia)	3	5	14	19
Lukas Heri	(Switzerland)	3	11	8	19
Luke Coppinger	(Republic of Ireland)	3	11	8	19
Noah Hoselton	(Slovakia)	4	11	8	19
Pavel Dosly	(Czech Republic)	4	10	9	19

=== Goaltending leaders ===
Regular Season
Player	Team	GP	SA	SV	Sv%	GA	GAA
Devlin Shanahan	(Republic of Ireland)	4	124	110	0.887	14	4.88
Andrew Gallant	(Netherlands)	4	165	139	0.842	36	8.44
Craig Wende	(Germany)	4	143	119	0.832	23	7.50
Marko Celic	(Serbia)	4	187	146	0.781	41	10.37
Warren Hill	(Haudenosaunee)	4	161	125	0.776	36	10.71
Frank Scigliano	(England)	4	149	113	0.758	36	15.00
Hunyahdengowah Abrams	(United States)	4	140	106	0.757	34	10.45
Adam Branislav	(Slovakia)	4	129	95	0.736	34	15.01
Zachary Higgins	(Israel)	4	190	139	0.732	51	14.68
Richard Zeidlitz	(Sweden)	4	127	89	0.701	38	21.86
Playoffs
Player	Team	GP	SA	SV	SV%	GA	GAA
Frank Scigliano	(England)	4	222	182	0.820	40	11.13
Craig Wende	(Germany)	3	145	117	0.807	28	9.96
Richard Zeidlitz	(Sweden)	4	217	173	0.797	44	11.81
Travis Sandin	(Slovakia)	4	112	89	0.795	24	11.39
Andrew Gallant	(Netherlands)	3	118	93	0.788	25	15.60
Minimum 75 saves. Source:

=== All World Team ===
Forwards

Mark Matthews, Canada

Randy Staats, Iroquois

Transition

Joel White, United States

Defense

Graeme Hossack, Canada

Kyle Rubisch, Canada

Goaltender

Mike Poulin, Canada

Most Valuable Player
Cody Jamieson, Forward, Iroquois

=== President's Team ===
Forwards

Robert Raittila, Finland

Matthew Taylor, Australia

Transition

Adrian Balasch, Austria

Defense

David Beckmann, Germany

Markus Mattila, Finland

Goaltender

Craig Wende, Germany
