= United States national indoor lacrosse team =

- Association: US Lacrosse
- Head coach: Regy Thorpe
- Website: www.usalacrosse.com/us-mens-box
Medal record
Box World Championships
| Silver medal – second place | 2024 Utica |
| Bronze medal – third place | 2003 Ontario |
| Bronze medal – third place | 2007 Halifax |
| Bronze medal – third place | 2011 Prague |
| Bronze medal – third place | 2015 Onondaga Nation |
| Bronze medal – third place | 2019 Langley |

The United States national indoor lacrosse team represents the U.S. in box lacrosse at the World Lacrosse Box Championships. Team USA has won the bronze medal in all five WILC tournaments. The team is organized by US Lacrosse, the national governing body. US Indoor Lacrosse was named to form and manage the 2007 and 2011 Teams. The roster usually consists of professional players, some of which play in the National Lacrosse League or Major League Lacrosse.

== Competition achievements ==
=== Box World Championships ===
World Lacrosse Box Championships record
| Year | Result | Matches | Wins | Draws | Losses | PF | PA | Coach |
|---|---|---|---|---|---|---|---|---|
| (Canada) 2003 | Third place | 7 | 3 | 0 | 4 | 99 | 91 | |
| (Canada) 2007 | Third place | 6 | 4 | 0 | 2 | 82 | 60 | |
| (Czech Republic) 2011 | Third place | 6 | 4 | 0 | 2 | 100 | 41 | |
| (Haudenosaunee) 2015 | Third place | 7 | 4 | 0 | 3 | 90 | 70 | |
| (Canada) 2019 | Third place | 7 | 4 | 0 | 3 | 91 | 61 | |
| (United States) 2024 | Runner-up | 6 | 4 | 0 | 2 | 92 | 56 | |
| Total | 6/6 | 39 | 23 | 0 | 16 | 554 | 379 | — |

== 2007 FIL ==
At the 2007 ILF World Indoor Lacrosse Championship, the tournament took place between May 14 and 20 at the Halifax Metro Centre in Halifax, Nova Scotia, Canada. Canada was the defending champion and again beat the Iroquois Nationals in the final, this time 15–14 in overtime. Team USA defeated England 17–10 to won their second bronze medal.

== 2011 WILC ==
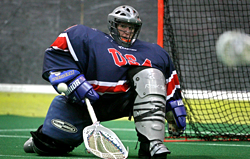
Ginny Capicchioni was the first woman ever named to the Team USA roster

At the 2011 FIL World Indoor Lacrosse Championship, Team USA came very close to reaching the gold medal game. In group play, they were beaten by the Iroquois Nationals only by one goal, 10–11. Their semi-final game was very close too, when they lost to Canada 10–15. In the bronze medal game, Team USA beat the Czech Republic 16–7. Casey Powell was named tournament MVP.

== 2019 WILC ==
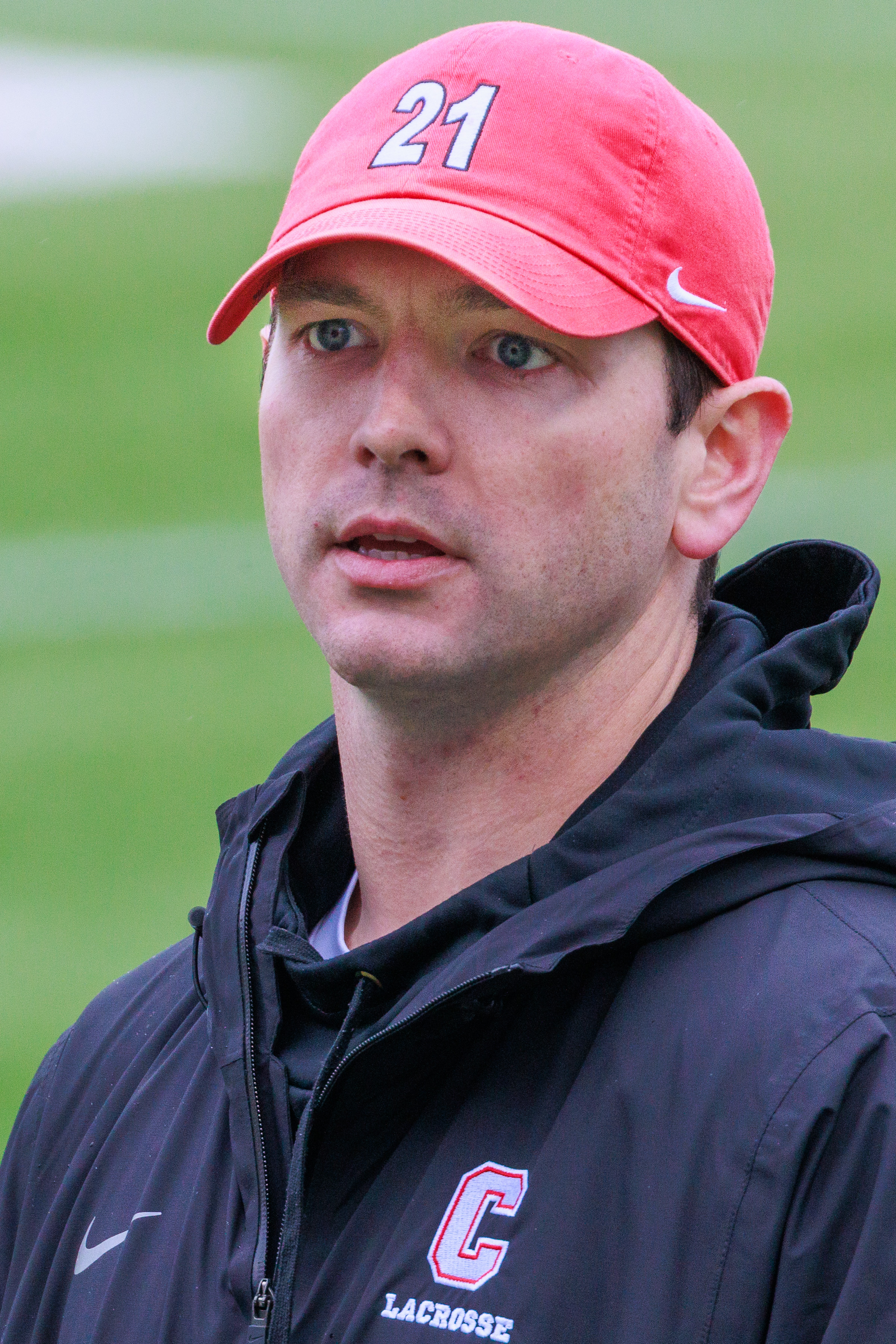
Connor Buczek scored four goals and three assists in the 2019 tournament

The roster for the 2019 World Indoor Lacrosse Championship was announced on July 25, 2019.

| Name | Position | Team |
|---|---|---|
| Gowah Abrams | Goalie | Philadelphia Wings |
| Trevor Baptiste | Transition | Philadelphia Wings |
| Connor Buczek | Transition | |
| Greg Downing | Transition | New England Blackwolves |
| Matt Dunn | Defense | Georgia Swarm |
| Tim Edwards | Transition | Colorado Mammoth |
| Anthony Kelly | Transition | |
| Connor Kelly | Forward | New York Riptide |
| Jacob Lazore | Goalie | |
| Brett Manney | Defense | New England Blackwolves |
| David Mather | Goalie | |
| Kieran McArdle | Forward | New York Riptide |
| Ethan O’Connor | Defense | Buffalo Bandits |
| Chris O’Dougherty | Defense | Vancouver Warriors |
| Adam Osika | Transition | |
| Cody Radziewicz | Transition | |
| Matt Rambo | Forward | Philadelphia Wings |
| John Ranagan | Defense | New York Riptide |
| Joe Resetarits | Forward | New England Blackwolves |
| Blaze Riorden | Forward | Philadelphia Wings |
| Tom Schreiber | Forward | Toronto Rock |
| Taylor Stuart | Transition | Colorado Mammoth |
| Gale Thorpe | Forward | |
| Joel White | Transition | |

== 2024 WBLC ==
The roster for the 2024 World Lacrosse Box Championship was announced on August 14, 2024. Tom Schreiber was forced out of the squad with an injury and was replaced with Eli Gobrecht on August 23.

| Player | Position | College | Grad year | NLL Team |
|---|---|---|---|---|
| Gowah Abrams | Goalie | N/A | N/A | N/A |
| Zach Belter | Defense | St. Bonaventure | 2022 | Buffalo Bandits |
| Charlie Bertrand | Forward | Merrimack/Virginia | 2020/21 | Las Vegas Desert Dogs |
| TJ Comizio | Defense | Villanova | 2019 | Georgia Swarm |
| Tim Edwards | Defense | Canisius | 2015 | Colorado Mammoth |
| Eli Gobrecht | Defense | Ithaca | 2016 | San Diego Seals |
| Jack Hannah | Forward | Denver | 2022 | Las Vegas Desert Dogs |
| Drew Hutchison | Goalie | RIT | 2022 | Halifax Thunderbirds |
| CJ Kirst | Forward | Cornell | 2025 | N/A |
| Connor Kirst | Transition | Villanova/Rutgers | 2020/21 | Las Vegas Desert Dogs |
| Danny Logan | Defense | Denver | 2021 | San Diego Seals |
| Joe Nardella | Transition | Rutgers | 2015 | Albany FireWolves |
| Ethan O'Connor | Defense | Hobart | 2013 | Rochester Knighthawks |
| Mac O'Keefe | Forward | Penn State | 2021 | San Diego Seals |
| Joe Resetarits | Forward | Albany | 2012 | Philadelphia Wings |
| Blaze Riorden | Forward | Albany | 2016 | Philadelphia Wings |
| Brandon Robinson | Forward | Laurier | 2022 | Buffalo Bandits |
| Dylan Robinson | Transition | N/A | N/A | Buffalo Bandits |
| Joey Spallina | Forward | Syracuse | 2026 | N/A |
| Dalton Sulver | Defense | High Point | 2021 | Buffalo Bandits |
| Ryan Terefenko | Transition | Ohio State | 2021 | Halifax Thunderbirds |
| John Wagner | Defense | Marquette | 2019 | Albany FireWolves |
| Joel White | Defense | Syracuse | 2011 | N/A |
