= Canada national indoor lacrosse team =

Men's box lacrosse national team

Medal record

World Indoor Lacrosse Championship
Gold medal – first place	2003 Ontario	
Gold medal – first place	2007 Halifax	
Gold medal – first place	2011 Prague	
Gold medal – first place	2015 Onondaga Nation	
Gold medal – first place	2019 Langley	
Gold medal – first place	2024 Utica	

The Canada national indoor lacrosse team represents Canada in international tournaments of indoor lacrosse. It is the best national box lacrosse team in the world, having won all five World Indoor Lacrosse Championships, starting with the 2003 ILF World Indoor Lacrosse Championship held in Canada. Team Canada has never lost a game in the tournament. Outside of the world championships, they have only lost to the United States twice out of ten games. Their biggest rivals are the Haudenosaunee, who have finished in second place in four out of five tournaments.

Team Canada consists of primarily professional players from the National Lacrosse League. Many players also play Major Series Lacrosse or in the Western Lacrosse Association.

== World Indoor Lacrosse Championship ==
=== 2003 ===
The first World Indoor Lacrosse Championship was held in Toronto, Ontario, Canada. Canada entered the tournament as the favourite to win. They went through the six-team group without any losses. In the semifinals they beat Team USA. Team Canada, led by captain Jim Veltman, won the gold medal match against Iroquois Nationals 21-4 and became the first World Indoor Lacrosse Champions.

=== 2007 ===
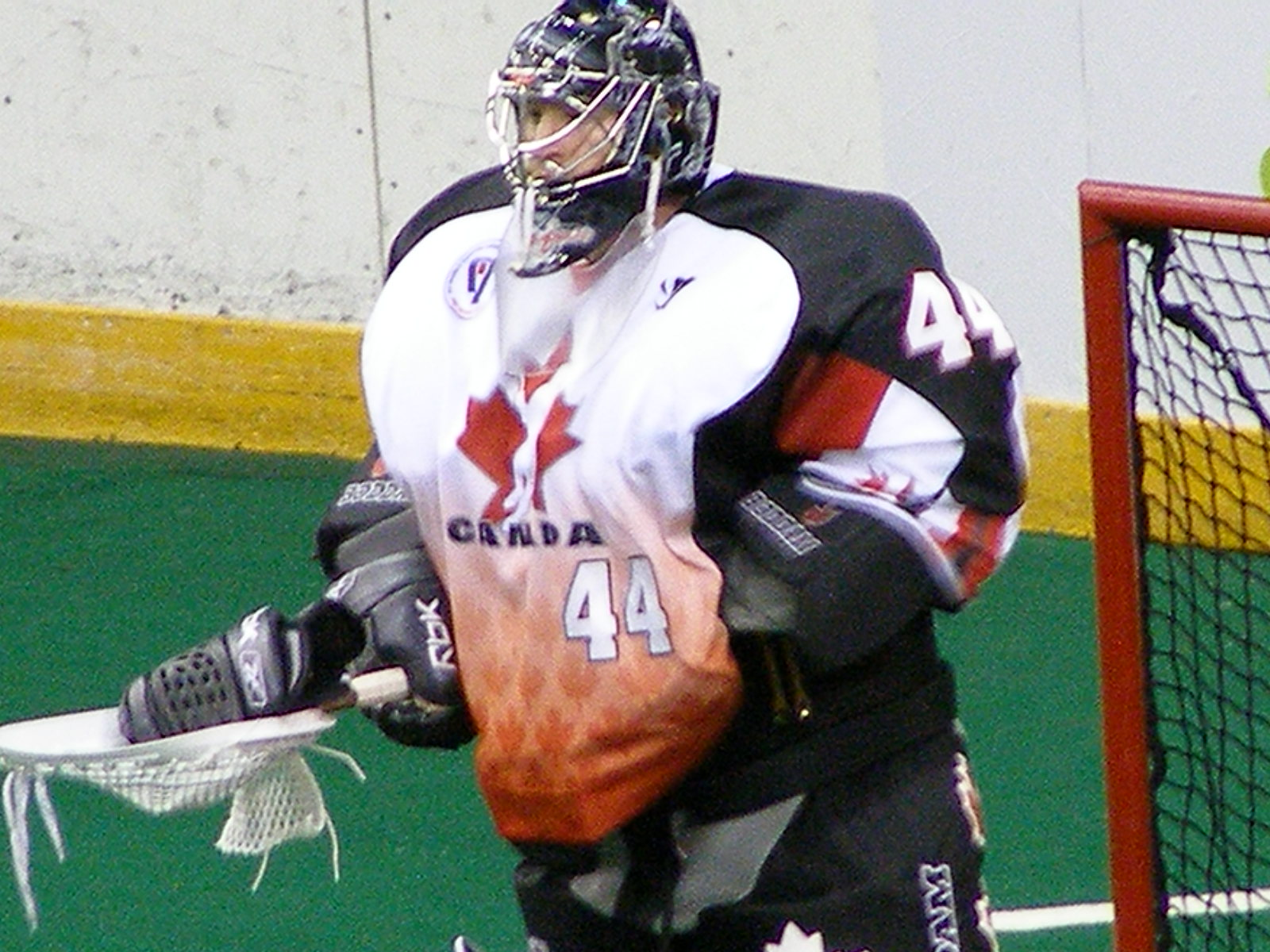
2007 World Indoor Lacrosse Championship in Halifax

The second World Indoor Lacrosse Championship was held in Canada again, this time in Halifax. The tournament was divided in two groups of four teams. Canada met Ireland, Australia and the United States in group play. They prevailed in all three matches to reach the semifinals, where they would meet England. Canada won 24–8 to move to the final, where they met the Iroquois Nationals again. Canada was down during the second and third quarters, but thanks to two goals from John Grant, Jr., they ended up taking the game to overtime. After thirty seconds, Jeff Zywicki scored his first goal of the game, so Team Canada could be crowned as the World Champion again.

=== 2011 ===
The 2011 FIL World Indoor Lacrosse Championship was held in the Czech Republic, the first time the tournament was held outside of Canada. The format of the tournament remained the same and the Canadians met Australia, England and Slovakia in group play. Canada went through unbeaten again. They beat Team USA 15–10 in the semifinal. In the final, they met the Iroquois Nationals again, and won 13–6.

=== 2015 ===
The Onondaga Nation near Syracuse, New York hosted the 2015 WILC. Once again, the Canadian team went undefeated and took gold while the Iroquois took the silver and the United States bronze.

=== Results ===
Year	Round Robin	Record W-L-T	Standing	Semifinal	Gold Medal Game
2003; Kitchener, Hamilton, Mississauga, and Oshawa, ON	W, Australia 28-5; W, Haudenosaunee 15-13; W, Czech Republic 25-1; W, Scotland 25-5; W, United States 16-5	5-0-0	1st of 6	W, United States 17-9	W, Haudenosaunee 21-4; CHAMPIONS
2007; Halifax, NS	W, Ireland 25-1; W, Australia 24-4; W, United States 18-5	3-0-0	1st of 4 Pool A	W, England 24-9	W, Haudenosaunee 15-14 OT; CHAMPIONS
2011; Prague	W, Slovakia 27-1; W, Australia 26-2; W, England 28-5	3-0-0	1st of 4 Pool A	W, United States 15-10	W, Haudenosaunee 13-6; CHAMPIONS
2015; Onondaga Nation and Syracuse, NY	W, Haudenosaunee 11-9; W, Czech Republic 19-2; W, United States 18-7; W, England 19-2	4-0-0	1st of 5 Blue Division	W, Israel 19-3	W, Haudenosaunee 12-8; CHAMPIONS
2019; Langley, BC	W, United States 16-6; W, England 18-5; W, Israel 17-5; W, Haudenosaunee 19-12	4-0-0	1st of 5 Blue Division	W, England 21-4	W, Haudenosaunee 19-12; CHAMPIONS
2024; Utica, NY	W, England 19-4; W, Haudenosaunee 13-10; W, United States 14-10	4-0-0	1st of 4 Pool A	W, England 20-3	W, United States 13-7; CHAMPIONS

== Roster ==
The following 23 players were called up for the 2024 World Box Lacrosse Championship

Player	Position	Minor/Jr Program	NLL Team	NCAA Team
Bryan Cole	Transition	Oakville Buzz (OLA)	Georgia Swarm	Maryland '16
Challen Rogers	Transition	Coquitlam Adanacs (BCLA)	Toronto Rock	Stony Brook '16
Christian Del Bianco	Goalie	Coquitlam Adanacs (BCLA)	Free agent	N/A
Dhane Smith	Forward	KW Kodiaks (OLA)	Buffalo Bandits	N/A
Dillon Ward	Goalie	Orangeville Northmen (OLA)	Colorado Mammoth	Bellarmine '13
Eli Salama	Defense	Coquitlam Adanacs (BCLA)	Calgary Roughnecks	RIT '18
Graeme Hossack	Defense	Whitby Warriors (OLA)	Halifax Thunderbirds	Lindenwood '15
Ian MacKay	Transition	Orangeville Northmen (OLA)	Buffalo Bandits	Vermont '18
Jake Withers	Defense	Peterborough Lakers (OLA)	Halifax Thunderbirds	Ohio State '17
Jeff Teat	Forward	Brampton Excelsiors (OLA)	Ottawa Black Bears	Cornell '21
Josh Byrne	Forward	New Westminster Salmonbellies (BCLA)	Buffalo Bandits	Hofstra '17
Latrell Harris	Defense	St. Catharines Athletics (OLA)	Toronto Rock	N/A
Matt Gilray	Defense	Peterborough Lakers (OLA)	Rochester Knighthawks	Bucknell '18
Mitch de Snoo	Defense	Whitby Warriors/Clarington Gaels (OLA)	Toronto Rock	Drexel '15
Nick Chaykowsky	Defense	Barrie Lakeshores (OLA)	Albany Firewolves	N/A
Nick Rose	Goalie	Orangeville Northmen (OLA)	Toronto Rock	N/A
Robert Church	Forward	Coquitlam Adanacs (BCLA)	Saskatchewan Rush	Drexel '13
Ryan Smith	Forward	Burlington Blaze (OLA)	Rochester Knighthawks	Robert Morris '21
Shayne Jackson	Forward	Whitby Warriors (OLA)	Georgia Swarm	Limestone '12
Steve Priolo	Defense	St. Catharines Athletics (OLA)	Buffalo Bandits	N/A
Tanner Cook	Defense	Whitby Warriors (OLA)	Calgary Roughnecks	North Carolina '21
Wes Berg	Forward	Coquitlam Adanacs (BCLA)	San Diego Seals	Denver '15
Zach Currier	Transition	Peterborough Lakers (OLA)	San Diego Seals	Princeton '17

=== Alternates ===
Player	Position	Minor/Jr Program	NLL Team	NCAA Team
Alex Simmons	Forward	St. Catharines Athletics (OLA)	Albany Firewolves	Denver '22/Syracuse '23
Brett Dobson	Goalie	Whitby Warriors (OLA)	Georgia Swarm	St. Bonaventure '22
Jeff Cornwall	Defense	Coquitlam Adanacs (BCLA)	Calgary Roughnecks	N/A
Jordan Gilles	Defense	Richmond/Coquitlam Adanacs (BCLA)	Colorado Mammoth	N/A
Mitch Jones	Forward	Delta Islanders (BCLA)	Philadelphia Wings	N/A
Ryland Rees	Defense	Port Coquitlam Saints (BCLA)	Rochester Knighthawks	Stony Brook '19
Warren Jeffrey	Defense	Mimico Mountaineers (OLA)	Colorado Mammoth	Vermont '19

== Heritage Cup results ==
Since 2002, the Canadian national team has challenged for the Heritage Cup on four occasions, winning three times.

Year	Location	Winning team	Score	Losing team
2002	Canada (Mississauga, Ontario)	United States	21-16	Canada
2004	United States (Denver, Colorado)	Canada	17-8	United States
2013	Canada (Montreal, Quebec)	Canada	12-11	Haudenosaunee
2017	Canada (Hamilton, Ontario)	Canada	19-6	United States

== 1985 IBLA North American Cup ==
A 15-game exhibition series was scheduled to be played by Team Canada and Team USA to kick-start the newly formed International Box Lacrosse Association. Only eight games would end up being played with Canada winning 7–1.

- January 26 - Rochester - Canada 19 - USA 9
- February 2 - Philadelphia - USA 19 - Canada 17
- February 9 - Syracuse - Canada 16 - 12
- February ? - Baltimore - Canada 14 - USA 10
- February 17 - Norfolk, VA - Canada won over USA
- February 24 - Providence, RI - CANCELLED
- March 1 - Peterborough - Canada 20 - USA 13
- ??? - Troy, NY - Canada won over USA
- April 13 - Philadelphia - Canada 17 - USA 12
- April 21 - Montreal - CANCELLED
