= Ginny Capicchioni =

American lacrosse player

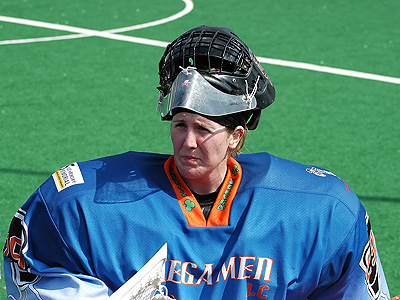

Personal information
- Nationality: American
- Born: Oradell, New Jersey, U.S.
- Height: 5 ft 8 in (173 cm)
- Weight: 170 lb (77 kg; 12 st 2 lb)

Sport
- Position: Goaltender
- NLL teams: New Jersey Storm
- Pro career: 2003

Ginny Capicchioni is a lacrosse goaltender. She played women's lacrosse at Sacred Heart University. After college she played men's box lacrosse in the National Lacrosse League, senior Canadian Lacrosse Association, and for Team USA at the 2011 World Indoor Lacrosse Championship. Capicchioni grew up in Oradell, New Jersey and attended River Dell Regional High School, where she played basketball, field hockey and softball.

Following her collegiate career, she became the first woman in North America to sign with a men's professional team, the first woman to play in a men's professional lacrosse game, the first American-born keeper to play in a Canadian Lacrosse Championship, and the first woman to play for a men's national team in any sport. After starting the game of lacrosse in college, she became the three-time Northeast Conference Goalie of the Year at Division I Sacred Heart University. Capicchioni twice ranked in the NCAA's Top 10 ins Save Percentage, while setting the program records for saves, goals against average, and career wins.

After playing with the New Jersey Storm of the National Lacrosse League (NLL), she began her nine-year career in the Canadian Lacrosse Association. Capicchioni's Canadian experience includes the Akwesasne Warriors on Cornwall Island, Ontario (ILA); the St. Clair Storm in Sarnia, Ontario (OLA); the Windsor Warlocks in Windsor, Ontario (OLA Major), the Windsor Aigles (QLL) in Windsor Quebec; the Island Redmen (ILA) on Cornwall Island, Ontario; the Mad Mohawk in Cornwall, Ontario (ILA), and the last two years with the Coquitlam Adanacs in Coquitlam, British Columbia (WLA, Major).

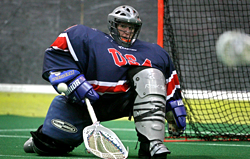
2011 World Indoor Lacrosse Championship

In 2010, Capicchioni was named to the USA World Team. She competed in the 2011 World Indoor Lacrosse Championships (Prague, Czech Republic) and compiled an overall 93% save percentage for the tourney. In 2012, Capicchioni signed with the Kentucky Stick horses in the NALL (North American Lacrosse League), who play in the prestigious Freedom Hall (Louisville, Kentucky). In 2013, Capicchioni signed with the Baltimore Bombers in the NALL. Recently, she was drafted second overall in the European Lacrosse League draft (Fall 2013). She competed with the expansion team Pietro Filipi, located in Radotin, Czech Republic. Capicchioni's team finished third place, and she finished 1st in save percentage with a .78.

Capicchioni's coaching career has included three years at Drew University, six years with Tristate lacrosse, a year at Immaculate Heart Academy (NJ), and a year at Bergen Catholic High School (NJ). With her first company Goal Guardians LLC (now Guardian Sports), she teaches male and female goaltenders in the tri-state area, ranging from youth to the university level. Capicchioni holds a BS in Political Science from Sacred Heart University (Fairfield, CT) and a master's degree in School Counseling from Loyola University Maryland (Baltimore, MD).

Capicchioni is the CEO and Founder of Guardian Sports and the creator of the GRC index. The GRC index is the first-ever quantifiable player-rating index in sports, outside of the NFL's QBR ratings, to provide statistical figures for coaches to compare and contrast the skills and athleticism of lacrosse goalies.

== Statistics ==
=== National Lacrosse League ===
		Regular Season						Playoffs
Season	Team	GP	Min	GA	Sv	GAA	Sv %	GP	Min	GA	Sv	GAA	Sv %
2003	New Jersey Storm	3	11	6	7	32.14	53.85%	--	--	--	--	--	--
NLL totals		3	11	6	7	32.14	53.85%	0	0	0	0	0	0

=== Major Series Lacrosse ===
		Regular Season					Playoffs
Season	Team	GP	G	A	Pts	PIM	GP	G	A	Pts	PIM
2004	Windsor Warlocks	5	0	0	0	0	-	-	-	-	-
MSL Totals		5	0	0	0	0	0	0	0	0	0

=== OLA Senior B Lacrosse League ===
		Regular Season					Playoffs
Season	Team	GP	G	A	Pts	PIM	GP	G	A	Pts	PIM
2005	St. Clair Storm	10	0	1	1	0	1	0	0	0	0
Sr. B Totals		10	0	1	1	0	1	0	0	0	0
