= Czech Republic national indoor lacrosse team =

Czech Republic national indoor lacrosse team is the national box lacrosse team of the Czech Republic which regularly participates in World Indoor Lacrosse Championship. Team consists of amateur players, who are members of Czech box lacrosse league NBLL. A few Canadian players from the National Lacrosse League with Czech ancestors are also members of this team. Box lacrosse is the most popular form of lacrosse in the Czech Republic, the team has had better results than in field lacrosse.

== World Indoor Lacrosse Championship ==
Czechs took part in the first World Indoor Lacrosse Championship (WILC) ever, held in Canada in 2003. They were overmatched by the international competition, but since they have become the best European box lacrosse national team. In 2007 they still weren't able to get to the semi-finals and finished in 7th place. In 2008, the Czech Republic was chosen as the host of 2011 WILC. Jim Veltman, one of the greatest lacrosse players of all time, became the Head Coach for this tournament. The Czech team showed plenty of improvements in Prague and they were able to beat England in the quarter-finals. In the semi-finals, they met the Iroquois Nationals, but this team was out of their powers. Although they lost to Team USA in the bronze medal game too, they presented themselves well and finished as the best European team.

== Roster ==
=== 2011 FIL World Indoor Lacrosse Championship roster ===
#	Pos.	Player	Team
38	G	Kurtis Wagar	(United States) Philadelphia Wings
1	G	Tomáš Říha	(Czech Republic) LCC Radotín
25	G	Marek Dobrý	(Czech Republic) LC Jižní Město
61	D	Aleš Veselý	(Czech Republic) LC Jižní Město
5	D	Martin Mrlík (A)	(Czech Republic) TJ Malešice
77	D	Radek Derganz	(Czech Republic) TJ Malešice
15	D	Martin Hodaň	(Czech Republic) LCC Radotín
28	D	Ladislav Kopfstein	(Czech Republic) TJ Malešice
13	D	Tomáš Říha	(Czech Republic) LC Pardubice
16	D	Marek Brada	(Czech Republic) LC Slavia Praha
4	T	Jakub Nováček	(Czech Republic) LC Jižní Město
20	T	Adam Kostka	(Czech Republic) LCC Radotín
33	T	Martin Kostka	(Czech Republic) LCC Radotín
3	T	Radek Skála	(Czech Republic) LCC Radotín
97	T	Kyle Ross (A)	(Canada) Toronto Rock
21	T	Chet Koneczny	(United States) Washington Stealth
29	F	Dominik Pešek	(Czech Republic) LCC Radotín
10	F	Pavel Došlý (C)	(Czech Republic) LC Jižní Město
9	F	Jiří Košťál	(Czech Republic) LCC Radotín
73	F	Petr Poupě (A)	(Czech Republic) LCC Radotín
24	F	Tomáš Beran	(Czech Republic) TJ Malešice
11	F	Jan Skokan	(Czech Republic) LC Pardubice
67	F	Jamie Plunkett	(Czech Republic) LC Jižní Město
