= 2011 World Indoor Lacrosse Championship =

Coordinates: 50°4′8″N 14°28′47″E

FIL Mistrovství světa v box lakrosu 2011

Tournament details
- Host country: Czech Republic
- Venue(s): Eden Arena
- Dates: 21–28 May
- Teams: 8

Final positions
- Champions: Canada (3rd title)
- Runner-up: Haudenosaunee
- Third place: United States
- Fourth place: Czech Republic

Tournament statistics
- Games played: 21
- Goals scored: 513 (24.43 per game)
- Scoring leader(s): (United States) Casey Powell (England) Tom Johnson (31 pts)

Awards
- MVP: (United States) Casey Powell

The 2011 World Indoor Lacrosse Championship was the third World Indoor Lacrosse Championship, an international box lacrosse tournament organized by the Federation of International Lacrosse every four years. It took place between 21 and 28 May 2011 in Prague, Czech Republic at the 4,900 seat Eden Arena, an Olympic-sized rink. The Canadian team was the defending champion and for the third time defeated the Iroquois Nationals in the finals, 13–6. The United States defeated the host Czech Republic 16–7 in the bronze medal game.

== Pool play ==
Eight participating teams were placed in two pools. After playing a round-robin, the first place team in each pool advanced to the semi-finals, the second and third placed teams advanced to the quarter-finals, and the fourth place teams advanced to the 7th place games.

Canada cruised through pool play with three easy victories. The Iroquois Nationals beat Ireland and the host Czech Republic by wide margins, but just edged the United States 11–10.

=== Pool A ===
Team	GP	W	L	GF	GA	DIF	Advanced to
Canada	3	3	0	81	8	+73	Semi-finals
England	3	2	1	49	43	+6	Quarter-finals
Australia	3	1	2	22	53	-31	Quarter-finals
Slovakia	3	0	3	15	63	-48	7th place games

All times are local (UTC+2).

21 May 2011; 16:00	England	20–8 (6–0, 8–2, 0–1, 6–5)	Australia	Eden Arena, Prague

26 min	Penalties	19 min
52	Shots	50

22 May 2011; 10:00	Slovakia	1–27 (0–13, 1–4, 0–8, 0–2)	Canada	Eden Arena, Prague

6 min	Penalties	4 min
21	Shots	52

23 May 2011; 10:00	Slovakia	7–24 (0–6, 3–5, 2–8, 2–5)	England	Eden Arena, Prague

16 min	Penalties	12 min
33	Shots	71

23 May 2011; 16:00	Canada	26–2 (9–1, 8–0, 3–0, 6–1)	Australia	Eden Arena, Prague

10 min	Penalties	18 min
46	Shots	38

24 May 2011; 10:00	Australia	12–7 (4–0, 5–4, 0–2, 3–1)	Slovakia	Eden Arena, Prague

21 min	Penalties	8 min
65	Shots	45

24 May 2011; 16:00	Canada	28–5 (10–0, 6–1, 4–1, 8–3)	England	Eden Arena, Prague

16 min	Penalties	16 min
45	Shots	45

=== Pool B ===
Team	GP	W	L	GF	GA	DIF	Advanced to
Haudenosaunee	3	3	0	59	18	+41	Semi-finals
United States	3	2	1	46	17	+29	Quarter-finals
Czech Republic	3	1	2	28	44	-16	Quarter-finals
(Republic of Ireland) Ireland	3	0	3	9	63	-54	7th place games

All times are local (UTC+2).

21 May 2011; 10:00	Ireland (Republic of Ireland)	3–23 (1–8, 1–7, 1–5, 0–3)	Haudenosaunee	Eden Arena, Prague

10 min	Penalties	18 min
32	Shots	79

21 May 2011; 19:30	United States	14–5 (2–1, 5–2, 2–0, 5–2)	Czech Republic	Eden Arena, Prague

6 min	Penalties	6 min
60	Shots	45

22 May 2011; 16:00	Ireland (Republic of Ireland)	1–22 (0–7, 1–12, 0–0, 0–3)	United States	Eden Arena, Prague

16 min	Penalties	14 min
25	Shots	67

22 May 2011; 19:00	Czech Republic	5–25 (1–6, 2–8, 2–7, 0–4)	Haudenosaunee	Eden Arena, Prague

14 min	Penalties	20 min
51	Shots	48

23 May 2011; 19:00	Haudenosaunee	11–10 (2–3, 2–4, 4–1, 3–2)	United States	Eden Arena, Prague

10 min	Penalties	19 min
50	Shots	55

24 May 2011; 19:00	Czech Republic	18–5 (2–1, 4–0, 9–2, 3–2)	(Republic of Ireland) Ireland	Eden Arena, Prague

16 min	Penalties	29 min
84	Shots	40

== Championship bracket ==
Goaltender Matt Vinc made 23 saves in the gold medal game, helping Canada to a 13-6 win and earning game MVP honors.

Quarter-finals
United States	28
Australia	2
England	7
Czech Republic	12

Semi-finals
Canada	15
United States	10
Haudenosaunee	19
Czech Republic	6

Gold medal game
Canada	13
Haudenosaunee	6
Bronze medal game
United States	16
Czech Republic	7

All times are local (UTC+2).

=== 7th place games ===
26 May 2011; 10:00	Slovakia	5–10 (1–2, 0–2, 2–5, 2–1)	Ireland	Eden Arena, Prague

Game reference
26 min	Penalties	10 min
53	Shots	60

27 May 2011; 10:00	Ireland (Republic of Ireland)	7–10 (2–0, 2–3, 0–3, 3–4)	Slovakia	Eden Arena, Prague

Game reference
11 min	Penalties	6 min
59	Shots	53

Ireland won 17–15 on aggregate.

=== Quarter-finals ===
26 May 2011; 16:00	United States	28–2 (6–0, 9–1, 8–1, 5–0)	Australia	Eden Arena, Prague

Game reference
8 min	Penalties	17 min
71	Shots	30

26 May 2011; 19:00	England	7–12 (2–1, 3–6, 1–2, 1–3)	Czech Republic	Eden Arena, Prague

Game reference
11 min	Penalties	22 min
60	Shots	70

=== 5th place game ===
28 May 2011; 10:00	Australia	8–23 (3–4, 2–4, 2–10, 1–5)	England	Eden Arena, Prague

Game reference
22 min	Penalties	10 min
62	Shots	77

=== Semi-finals ===
27 May 2011; 16:00	Canada	15–10 (3–2, 2–3, 5–1, 5–4)	United States	Eden Arena, Prague

Game reference
12 min	Penalties	8 min
54	Shots	61

27 May 2011; 19:00	Haudenosaunee	19–6 (3–1, 8–2, 3–1, 5–2)	Czech Republic	Eden Arena, Prague

Game reference
14 min	Penalties	10 min
64	Shots	52

=== Bronze medal game ===
28 May 2011; 16:00	United States	16–7 (3–2, 4–3, 5–1, 4–1)	Czech Republic	Eden Arena, Prague

Game reference
35 min	Penalties	48 min
71	Shots	49

=== Gold medal game ===
28 May 2011; 19:00	Canada	13–6 (2–1, 7–1, 3–2, 1–2)	Haudenosaunee	Eden Arena, Prague

Game reference
11 min	Penalties	8 min
56	Shots	48

== Ranking, leaders, and awards ==
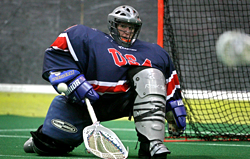
Ginny Capicchioni

=== Final standings ===
1st place, gold medalist(s)	Canada
2nd place, silver medalist(s)	Haudenosaunee
3rd place, bronze medalist(s)	United States
4	Czech Republic
5	England
6	Australia
7	(Republic of Ireland) Ireland
8	Slovakia

=== Scoring leaders ===
Player	G	A	Pts
(United States) Casey Powell	16	15	31
(England) Tom Johnson	15	16	31
(Canada) Colin Doyle	14	16	30
(Canada) Dan Dawson	14	13	27
(United States) Drew Westervelt	17	9	26
(England) James Delaney	16	10	26
(England) Shawn Cable	11	14	25
(Iroquois) Roger Vyse	15	9	24
(England) Chris Manwaring	17	6	23
(Canada) John Grant Jr.	11	12	23

=== Goaltending leaders ===
Player	GP	SV	GA	Sv%
(Republic of Ireland) Mike Cregan	5	80	9	90%
(Canada) Matt Vinc	5	77	17	82%
(Iroquois) Angus Goodleaf	5	65	14	82%
(Iroquois) Mike Thompson	5	75	21	78%
(England) Mathew Roik	5	122	37	77%
(United States) Erik Miller	6	91	27	77%
Minimum 65 saves. Source:

=== All World Team ===
Forwards

(Canada) Dan Dawson
(United States) Casey Powell

Transition

(Iroquois) Cody Jamieson

Defense

(Iroquois) Sid Smith
(Canada) Kyle Rubisch

Goaltender

(Canada) Matt Vinc

Most Valuable Player

(United States) Casey Powell
