= World Lacrosse Box Championships =

International box lacrosse championship

- Sport: Box lacrosse
- Founded: 2003
- No. of teams: 20
- Countries: World Lacrosse member nations
- Most recent champions: Canada (Men, 6th title); United States (Women, 1st title)
- Most titles: Canada (Men, 6 titles); United States (Women)
- 2024 World Lacrosse Box Championships

The World Lacrosse Box Championships (WLBC), formerly known as the World Indoor Lacrosse Championship (WILC), is an international box lacrosse tournament sponsored by World Lacrosse that is held every four years. Since the first tournament in 2003, Canada has won all five gold medals and is undefeated in all games. Canada hosted the first two tournaments in 2003 and 2007, the Czech Republic hosted in 2011, the Onondaga Nation, south of Syracuse, New York, hosted in 2015. The 2019 WILC was held in Langley, British Columbia, Canada.

The winner of the WLBC wins the Cockerton Cup, named for All-American lacrosse player Stan Cockerton.

In August 2023, World Lacrosse announced 2024 World Lacrosse Box Championships for men's and women's box lacrosse will held at September 20–29, 2024, in Utica, New York, United States.

== The Nations in 1980 ==
Box Lacrosse was invented in Canada in 1931, and it took a while for the indoor variant to take off outside of its home country. In the 1970s, it had begun to gain popularity in both Australia, due to a myth about its origin down under, and the United States, due to the short-lived NLA, and the idea of an international box tournament began to be spoken about. Tom Davies, the president of the British Columbia Lacrosse Association, was the first to raise the idea in 1974. In 1976, the Commonwealth Games accepted the bid for box lacrosse as a demonstration sport, and it featured in the 1978 Edmonton Games.

In 1980, the BCLA announced, with the backing of the International Lacrosse Federation, that a Nations Cup would be held in July 1980 in Vancouver. This tournament would include 5 teams, national teams from Australia and the US, a First Nations representative team, and two Canadian teams. The Canadian teams would be Canada West, represented by the WLA's Coquitlam Adanacs, and Canada East, represented by Ontario's Brooklin Redmen. Canada West were the round robin champions, having won all 4 games, and advanced to the final. Canada East and the Natives faced each other in the semi-final, and the Natives pulled off the upset, beating Brooklin 13-9. In front of 8,000 fans in the Pacific Coliseum, the Adanacs beat the Natives 16-11 in the final, and were crowned world champion.

The tournament was deemed a success, but the struggles of the American and Australian teams convinced many that non-Canadian teams were not quite ready to compete at the top level. The Nations Cup was never repeated, and another attempt at a Box world championship would not be made until 2003.

== Men ==
=== Champions ===
Year	Host sites	Host country	Champions	Final score	Runner-up	Third place
2003	Ontario	Canada	Canada	21–4	Haudenosaunee	United States
2007	Halifax	Canada	Canada	15–14 (OT)	Haudenosaunee	United States
2011	Prague	Czech Republic	Canada	13–6	Haudenosaunee	United States
2015	Onondaga Reservation, Syracuse	Iroquois Confederacy	Canada	12–8	Haudenosaunee	United States
2019	Langley	Canada	Canada	19–12	Haudenosaunee	United States
2024	Utica	United States	Canada	13–7	United States	Haudenosaunee

=== Medal table ===
Rank	Nation	Gold	Silver	Bronze	Total
1	Canada	6	0	0	6
2	Haudenosaunee	0	5	1	6
3	United States	0	1	5	6
Totals (3 entries)		6	6	6	18

=== Performance by team ===
Team	2003 (Canada) (6)	2007 (Canada) (8)	2011 (Czech Republic) (8)	2015 (Haudenosaunee) (13)	2019 (Canada) (20)	2024 (United States) (28)
Australia	5th	6th	6th	8th	9th	11th
Austria					14th	19th
Belgium						27th
Canada	1st	1st	1st	1st	1st	1st
China						15th
Costa Rica					20th	
Czech Republic	6th	7th	4th	7th	7th	6th
England		4th	5th	5th	4th	4th
Finland				9th	6th	9th
Germany				11th	10th	10th
Greece						23rd
Hong Kong					18th	21st
Hungary						28th
Ireland		8th	7th	6th	11th	7th
Haudenosaunee	2nd	2nd	2nd	2nd	2nd	3rd
Israel				4th	5th	5th
Italy						13th
Jamaica						22nd
Japan						8th
Mexico					19th	26th
Netherlands					8th	12th
Poland						17th
Puerto Rico						25th
Scotland	4th	5th			16th	18th
Serbia				12th	12th	
Slovakia			8th		13th	16th
Sweden					15th	
Switzerland				13th	17th	24th
Chinese Taipei						20th
Turkey				10th		
United States	3rd	3rd	3rd	3rd	3rd	2nd
U.S. Virgin Islands						14th

== Women ==
=== Champions ===
Year	Host sites	Host country	Champions	Final score	Runner-up	Third place
2024	Utica	United States	United States	10–7	Canada	Haudenosaunee

=== Medal table ===
Rank	Nation	Gold	Silver	Bronze	Total
1	United States	1	0	0	1
2	Canada	0	1	0	1
3	Haudenosaunee	0	0	1	1
Totals (3 entries)		1	1	1	3

=== Performance by team ===
Team	2024 (United States) (10)
Australia	4th
Canada	2nd
England	5th
Finland	10th
Germany	6th
Haudenosaunee	3rd
Hong Kong	9th
Ireland	8th
Netherlands	7th
United States	1st

== Performance by tournament ==
=== 2003 Indoor Championship ===
A	GP	W	L	GF	GA	PTS
Canada	5	5	0	109	29	10
Haudenosaunee	5	4	1	100	52	8
Scotland	5	3	2	63	69	6
United States	5	2	3	75	65	4
Australia	5	1	4	39	102	2
Czech Republic	5	0	5	29	98	0

Final: Canada 21, Iroquois 4
3rd place: United States 15, Scotland 9
5th place: Australia 21, Czech Republic 10

=== 2007 Indoor Championship ===
A	GP	W	L	GF	GA	PTS
Canada	3	3	0	67	10	6
United States	3	2	1	44	27	4
Australia	3	1	2	27	51	2
Ireland	3	0	3	9	59	0
B	GP	W	L	GF	GA	PTS
Haudenosaunee	3	3	0	70	16	6
England	3	2	1	32	41	4
Scotland	3	1	2	22	43	2
Czech Republic	3	0	3	20	44	0

Final: Canada 15, Iroquois 14, OT
3rd place: United States 17, England 10
5th place: Scotland 14, Australia 8
7th place: Czech Republic 22, Ireland 5

=== 2011 Indoor Championship ===
A	GP	W	L	GF	GA	PTS
Canada	3	3	0	81	8	3
England	3	2	1	49	43	2
Australia	3	1	2	22	53	1
Slovakia	3	0	3	15	63	0
B	GP	W	L	GF	GA	PTS
Haudenosaunee	3	3	0	59	18	3
United States	3	2	1	46	17	2
Czech Republic	3	1	2	28	44	1
Ireland	3	0	3	9	63	0

Final: Canada 13, Iroquois 6
3rd place: United States 16, Czech Republic 7
5th place: England 23, Australia 8
7th place: Ireland 17, Slovakia 15 (2 game aggregate)

=== 2015 Indoor Championship ===
Blue	GP	W	L	GF	GA	PTS
Canada	4	4	0	67	20	4
Haudenosaunee	4	3	1	59	30	3
United States	4	2	2	43	47	2
Czech Republic	4	1	3	22	57	1
England	4	0	4	24	61	0
Red	GP	W	L	GF	GA	PTS
Australia	3	3	0	49	29	3
Finland	3	2	1	37	22	2
Turkey	3	1	2	39	40	1
Switzerland	3	0	3	17	51	0
Green	GP	W	L	GF	GA	PTS
Israel	3	2	1	36	24	2
Ireland	3	2	1	27	29	2
Serbia	3	1	2	29	36	1
Germany	3	1	2	27	30	1

Final: Canada 12, Iroquois 8
3rd place: United States 15, Israel 4
5th place: England 14, Ireland 12
7th place: Czech Republic 20, Australia 11
9th place: Finland 24, Turkey 6
11th place: Germany 13, Serbia 12

== See also ==
- Box lacrosse
- Federation of International Lacrosse
- Women's Lacrosse World Cup
- World Lacrosse Men's U20 Championship
- World Lacrosse Women's U20 Championship
- World Junior Lacrosse Championship (men)
- European Box Lacrosse Championships (men)
