= Box lacrosse =

Indoor version of lacrosse

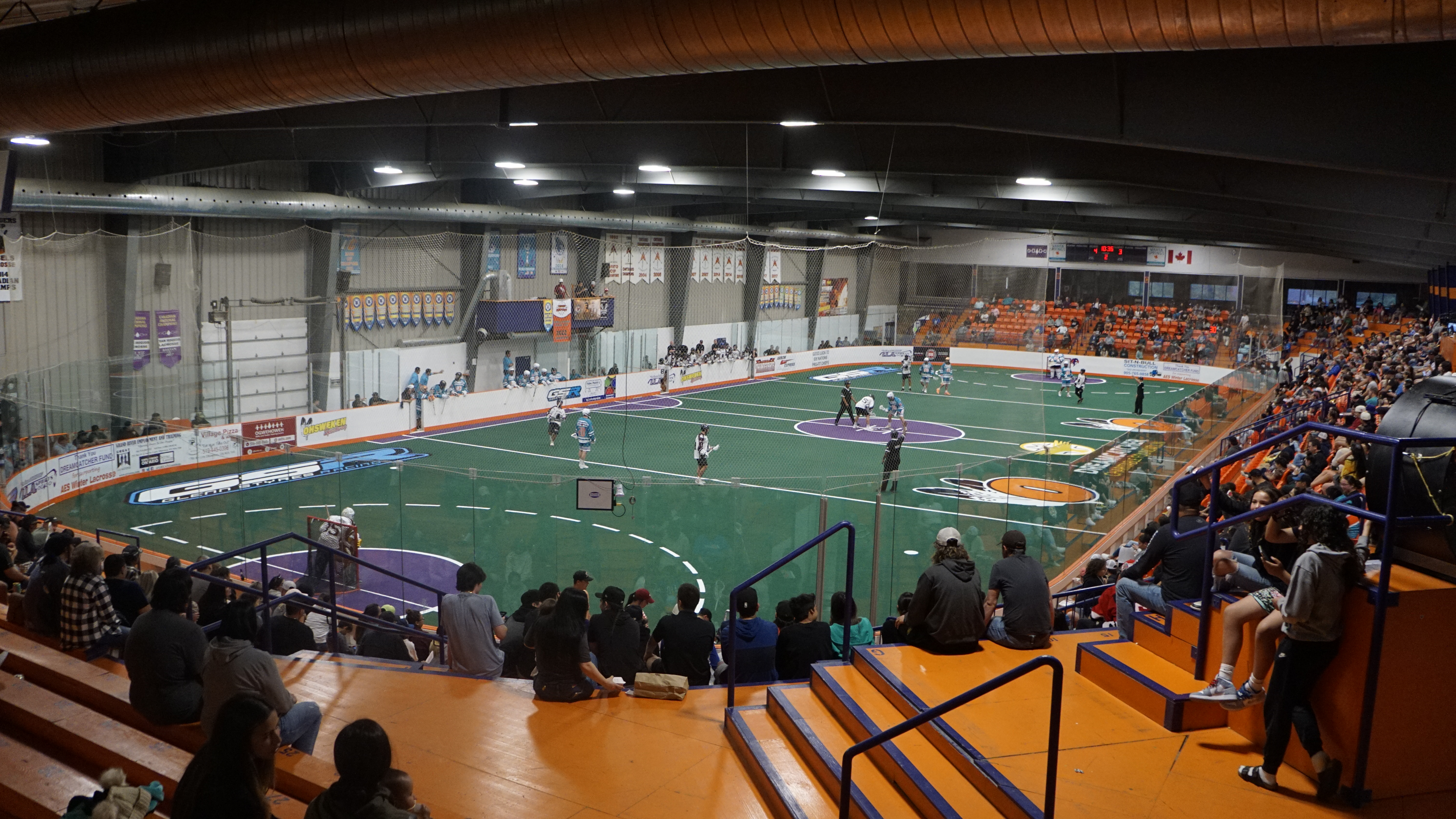
- Box Lacrosse venue
- Highest governing body: World Lacrosse
- Nicknames: Box lax, box
- First played: 1930s in Canada

Characteristics
- Contact: Collision
- Team members: Five runners and a goalie

Box lacrosse, also known as boxla, box, or indoor lacrosse, is an indoor version of lacrosse played mostly in North America. Box lacrosse is traditionally played on an ice hockey rink once the ice has been removed or covered. The playing area is called a box, in contrast to the open playing field of field lacrosse. Box lacrosse is played between two teams of five players and one goalie each. The object of the game is to use a lacrosse stick to catch, carry, and pass the ball in an effort to score by shooting a solid rubber lacrosse ball into the opponent's goal.

The game originated in the 1930s in Canada, where it is more popular than field lacrosse.

While there are 62 total members of World Lacrosse, only fifteen have competed in international box lacrosse competition. Only Canada, the Haudenosaunee Nationals and the United States have finished in the top three places at the World Indoor Lacrosse Championships. The most prestigious domestic competition is the National Lacrosse League.

== History ==
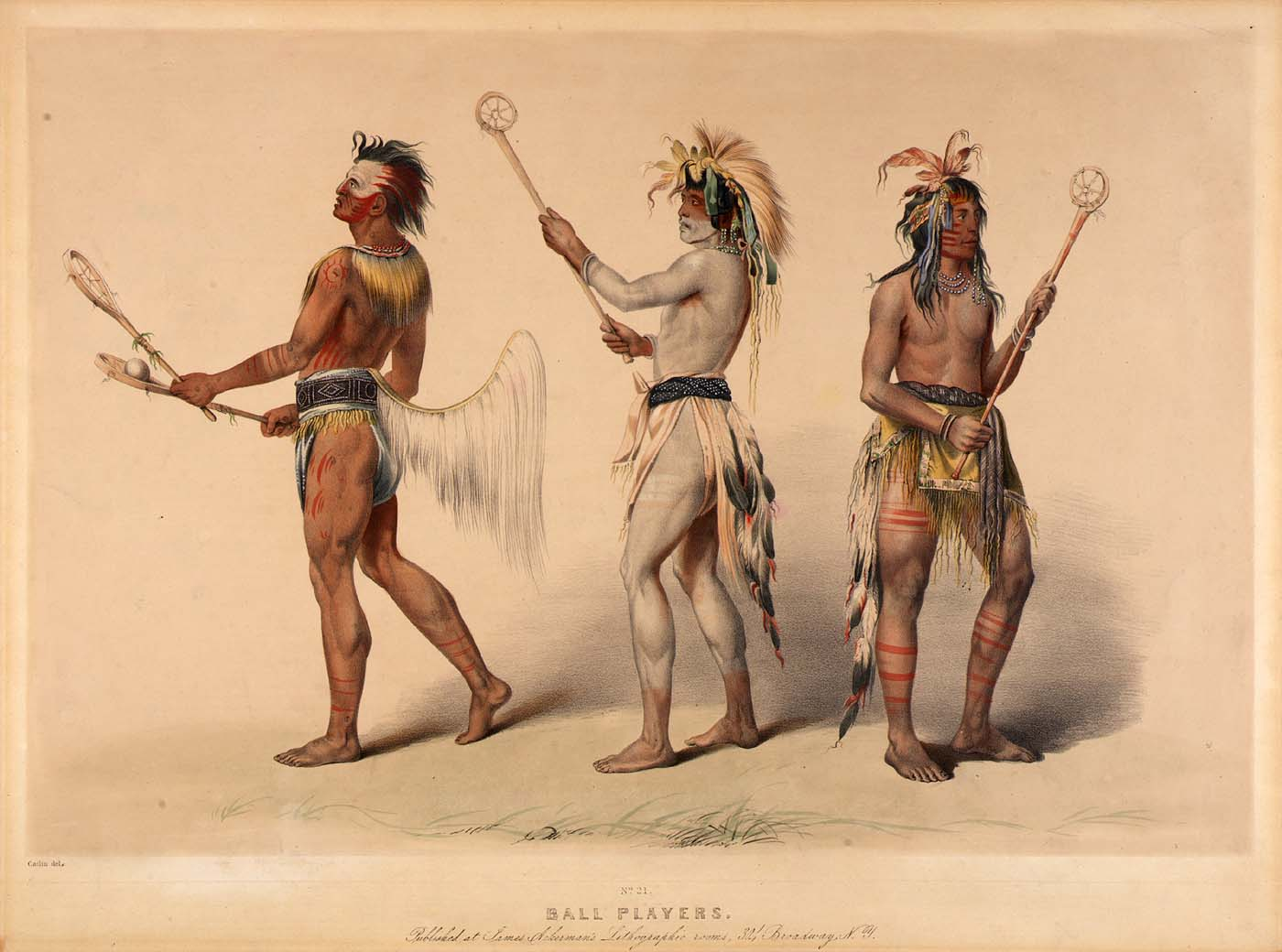
Ball players, a colour lithograph by George Catlin, illustrates various Native Americans playing lacrosse.

Lacrosse is a traditional indigenous people's game and was first encountered by Europeans when French Jesuit missionaries in the St. Lawrence Valley witnessed the game in the 1630s. Lacrosse for centuries was seen as a key element of cultural identity and spiritual healing to the people of Turtle Island. It originated as a field game and was adopted first by Canadian, American, and English athletes as a field game, eventually settling on a 10 v 10 format.

Box lacrosse is a modern version of the game that was invented in Canada during the 1920s and 1930s. The roots of indoor lacrosse are obscure, but its invention has been attributed to one Paddy Brennan, a field lacrosse player and referee from Montreal, who, being annoyed by the constant slowing of play from balls going out of bounds in the field game, experimented with indoor games at the Mount Royal Arena during the early 1920s.

Joseph Cattarinich and Leo Dandurand, owners of the National Hockey League's Montreal Canadiens in the 1920s, led the participating ice hockey arena owners to introduce the new sport. In the 1930s, 6 v 6 indoor lacrosse came to be played in the summer in unused hockey rinks. Canadians adopted the new version of the sport quickly. Eventually, it became the more popular version of the sport in Canada, supplanting field lacrosse. The form was also adopted as the primary version of the game played on Native American reservations in the US and Canada by the Haudenosaunee and other Native peoples. It is the only sport in which the American indigenous people are sanctioned to compete internationally, participating as the Haudenosaunee Nationals. However, many field lacrosse enthusiasts viewed the new version of the sport with negativity.

The first professional box lacrosse games were held in 1931. That summer, the arena owners formed the International Lacrosse League, featuring four teams: the Montreal Canadiens, Montreal Maroons, Toronto Maple Leafs, and Cornwall Colts. The league lasted only two seasons. In the wake of the original International Lacrosse League opened the American Box Lacrosse League featuring six teams: two in New York City, and one each in Brooklyn, Toronto, Boston, and Baltimore. The league played to small crowds on outdoor fields such as Yankee Stadium and Fenway Park, before closing midway through its inaugural season. Lacrosse was officially declared Canada's National Summer Sport with the passage of the National Sports Act (Bill C-212) on May 12, 1994.

The first box lacrosse match conducted in Australia came about as part of a fund raising appeal for the Queen Victoria Hospital, Melbourne. The Victorian Lacrosse Association was approached by the appeal committee to stage a lacrosse match as part of a multi sport carnival at the Plaza (Wattle Path Palais) ballroom at St Kilda on 1 July 1931. After a lightning six-a-side (outdoor) tournament format was successfully carried out a few weeks prior, it was decided to play six-a-side for this exhibition game between MCC and a composite team from other clubs, with players wearing rubber shoes and using a softer ball for the match. Newspaper articles at the time suggest that the sport may have even been created in Australia, with P. J. Lally of the famous Canadian lacrosse stick manufacturing company requesting a copy of the rules of the game from the VLA Secretary. By 1933, box lacrosse matches were being played in Adelaide, Brisbane, and Perth. This new version of the game however did not overtake the traditional version of lacrosse in popularity in Australia as happened in Canada.

The Canadian Lacrosse Association began sponsoring box lacrosse. In 1932, the Mann Cup, the most prestigious lacrosse trophy in Canada, was contended for under box lacrosse rules for the first time. Previously, the national senior men's lacrosse championship, awarded since 1901, was competed for under field lacrosse rules. The Mann Cup is an annual tournament that presents the champion of the Western Lacrosse Association and Major Series Lacrosse in a best of seven national championship. A few years later, in 1937, the Minto Cup, which had been the professional trophy in the 1910s and 20s, began being awarded under box lacrosse rules to the junior men's champions. Currently the Canadian Lacrosse Association oversees the Mann Cup, the Minto Cup, the Presidents Cup (Senior B national championship) the Founders Cup (Junior B national championship) all under box lacrosse rules.

Briefly in 1939, a professional box lacrosse league started up in California, called the Pacific Coast Lacrosse Association. This four team league also folded shortly after opening. Professional box lacrosse did not return to the United States again until 1968 when the Portland Adanacs and Detroit Olympics franchises played in the National Lacrosse Association, a circuit that folded after one summer season.

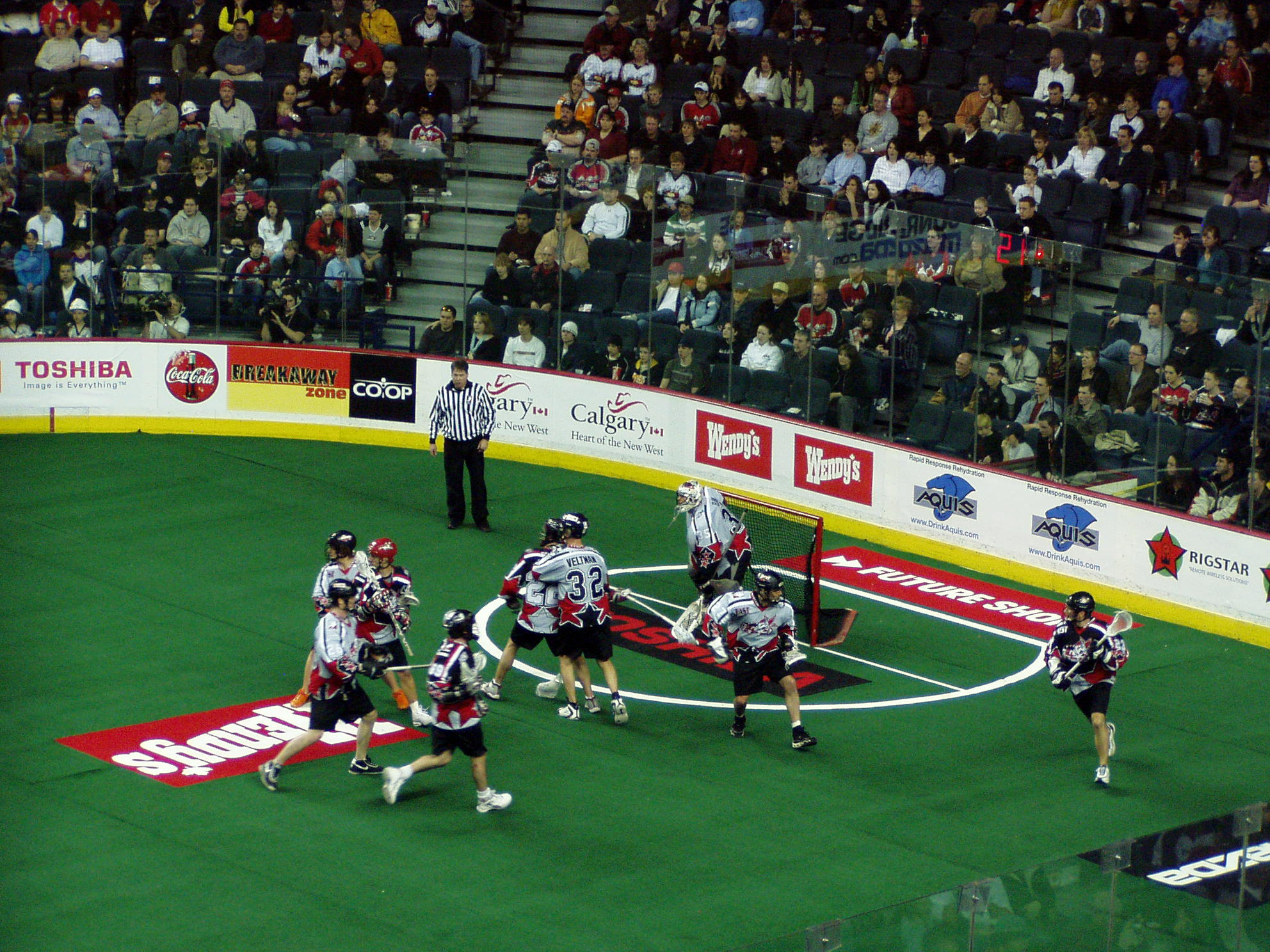
National Lacrosse League action during an All-Star Game in 2005

A new professional indoor lacrosse league was created in the 1970s with the formation of the original National Lacrosse League. This league opened in 1974 with teams in Montreal, Toronto, Rochester, Syracuse, Philadelphia, and Maryland. For the 1975 season, Rochester moved to Boston, Syracuse moved to Quebec City, and Toronto moved to Long Island. Thus, by its second year, the original NLL was playing in all major league arenas: the Colisée de Québec, the Montreal Forum, the Boston Garden, Nassau Coliseum, the Spectrum, and the Capital Centre. When the two wealthier '75 NLL franchises, Philadelphia and Maryland, finished out of the playoffs, and with Montreal losing access to the fabled Montreal Forum in the upcoming season due to the 1976 Montreal Olympic Games, the league folded after two seasons due to financial uncertainty.

The rebirth of professional box lacrosse in the United States came on March 13, 1986, with the formation of the Eagle Pro Box Lacrosse League, which was incorporated by Russ Cline and Chris Fritz. The league originated with four teams: the Philadelphia Wings, New Jersey Saints, Washington Wave, and Baltimore Thunder, and unlike box lacrosse generally, was played during the winter. The league rebranded itself as the Major Indoor Lacrosse League (MILL) immediately after its inaugural season, and in 1998 renamed itself again, this time to the NLL. In 1998, the NLL entered into the Canadian market for the first time with the Ontario Raiders, renamed after 1 season to the Toronto Rock.

In 2025, the NLL consists of 14 teams, evenly split between the United States and Canada. The league is very volatile, with teams moving or folding every few years. The most recent change is the move of the Firewolves from Albany, New York, to Oshawa, Ontario. The oldest team that has not moved from its original location is the Buffalo Bandits, who were founded in 1992 and are the league's most successful club, having won seven championships.

A semi-professional league called the Arena Lacrosse League was formed in 2017, with all teams in Ontario. It signed an agreement with the NLL to serve as its official minor league. Expansion has seen it grow to 12 teams in both Ontario and BC,

On June 29, 2022, a group of lacrosse fans announced a new league called the Professional Box Lacrosse Association. The league spokesperson identified nine teams which will be in cities in the United States. It barely lasted a single season, ceasing operations just a few weeks after games began.

== Rules ==
=== Players, equipment and officials ===
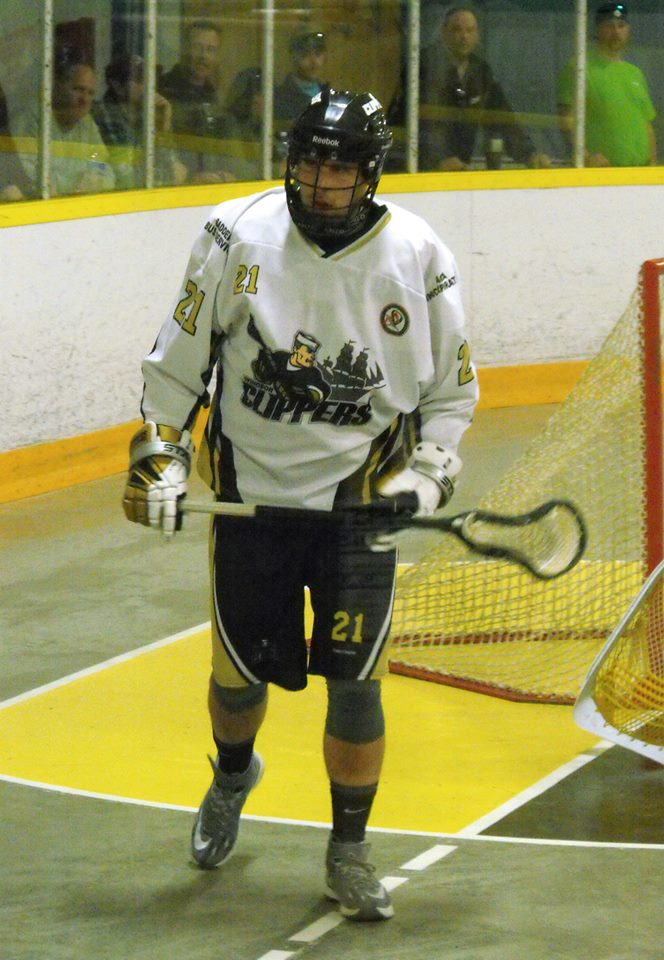
Windsor Clippers (OJBLL) runner in 2014.

During play, a team consists of six players: a goaltender and five "runners". A runner is any non-goalkeeper position player, including forwards, transition players, and defenders. Runners usually specialize in one of these roles and substitute off the field when the ball moves from one end to the other. When the sport originated teams played with six runners. However, in 1953 the sixth runner, a position called rover, was eliminated. The goalkeeper can be replaced by another runner, often when a delayed penalty has been called on the other team or at the end of games by teams that are behind to help score goals.

A player's lacrosse stick must be between 40 and 46 inches (1.02–1.17 m) in length (youth levels may use shorter sticks). In most leagues, the use of a traditional wooden stick is allowed. However, almost no players use wooden sticks any more, preferring aluminum or another metal, and a plastic head. In the NLL, wooden sticks are not allowed. Besides a stick, each player must also wear a certain amount of protective equipment, including a lacrosse helmet with face mask, lacrosse gloves, arm and shoulder pads, and back/kidney pads. Rib pads are optional in some leagues.

In some box leagues, especially the NLL, the five "runners" wear helmets specifically designed for box lacrosse. These helmets consist of a hockey helmet with a box lacrosse face mask attached instead of a hockey cage.

During a typical game the number of officials can range from one to three, depending on the league and level of play. In most games there are at least two referees: a lead official and a trail official. In NLL games there are three officials per game.

==== Goaltender ====
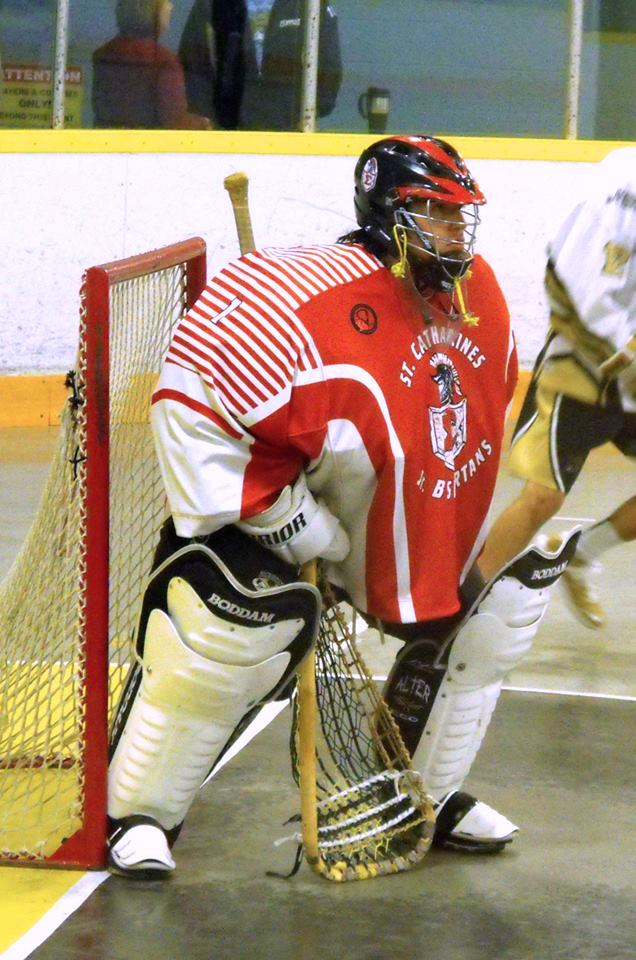
St. Catharines Spartans (OJBLL) goalie in 2014.

The goaltender's responsibility is to prevent the opposition from scoring goals by directly defending the net. Box lacrosse goaltenders equipment includes upper body gear (measuring no more than 3 inches (7.6 cm) up and 5 inches (13 cm) out off the shoulder—much larger than similar gear for field lacrosse or ice hockey goaltenders), large shin guards that must measure no more than 11 inches (28 cm) at the knee, 9 inches (23 cm) at the top of the shin and 7 inches (18 cm) at the ankle, and a field lacrosse helmet or ice hockey goalie mask.

The 9 feet (2.7 m) to 9 feet 3 inches (2.82 m) radius area surrounding the net is called the "crease". Players except for the goaltender may not enter the crease while playing the ball. Punishments for crease infractions include a change of possession, resetting of the time-clock, or a possible two-minute penalty depending on the infraction. Opposing players may not make contact with the goaltender while he is in the crease. Once he leaves the crease, however, he loses all goaltender privileges.

Even as box lacrosse grows in the United States, the American goalkeeper is a rarity. The skills required to be a successful field lacrosse goaltender and a successful box lacrosse goaltender are different and do not lend well to one another.

==== Defenders ====
A defender is a player position whose primary responsibility is to prevent the opposing team from scoring. Unlike in field lacrosse where some defensive players carry longer sticks, all box lacrosse defenders play with a maximum 46 inches (1.2 m) long stick. Defensive tactics include cross checking (where a player uses the shaft of his stick to push the opposition player off balance), body checking (where a player makes contact with the opposition player in order to slow him down), and stick checking (where a player makes contact with the opposition player's stick in order to knock the ball loose).

==== Transition ====
A transition player is a player whose responsibility is primarily to play during defensive situations with an offensive mindset. The goal of this player is to create fast breaks and scoring opportunities.

==== Attack ====
An attack is a player position on the field whose responsibility is primarily offensive. Typically, an Attack is dominant throwing with one hand or the other, and will primarily play on that side of the floor. Some players, known as creasemen, do not focus on one side or the other. These players instead focus their offensive attention near the crease area in front of the goaltender.

=== Playing area ===
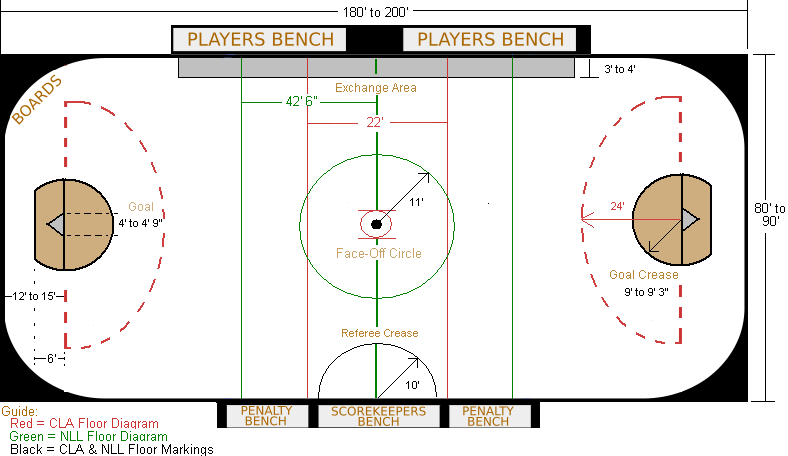
Detailed diagram illustrating the differences and similarities between Lacrosse Canada and National Lacrosse League box lacrosse playing areas

The playing area of box lacrosse is typically an ice hockey rink during the summer months. The playing surface is usually the concrete floor underneath the melted ice. Generally the playing area is 180 feet (55 m) to 200 feet (61 m) in length and 80 feet (24 m) to 90 feet (27 m) in width. The NLL plays on artificial turf placed on top of the ice. Some leagues, and teams that have dedicated box lacrosse arenas (such as the Haudenosaunee), have outfitted their playing surface with artificial turf similar to the NLL.

Box lacrosse goal dimensions are traditionally 4 feet (1.2 m) wide by 4 feet (1.2 m) tall. In the NLL, the dimensions are slightly larger at 4 feet 9 inches (1.45 m) wide by 4 feet (1.2 m) tall. These nets are significantly smaller than field lacrosse nets which measure 6 feet (1.8 m) wide by 6 feet (1.8 m) tall.

=== Duration and tie-breaking methods ===
A traditional game played under the rules of the Canadian Lacrosse Association consists of three periods of 20 minutes each (similar to ice hockey), with the teams changing ends each period. The NLL plays four 15-minute quarters rather than three periods. If the game is tied at the end of regulation play, a 5-minute overtime (15 in NLL) can be played. Overtime may or may not be sudden victory, depending on the league.

=== Ball in and out of play ===
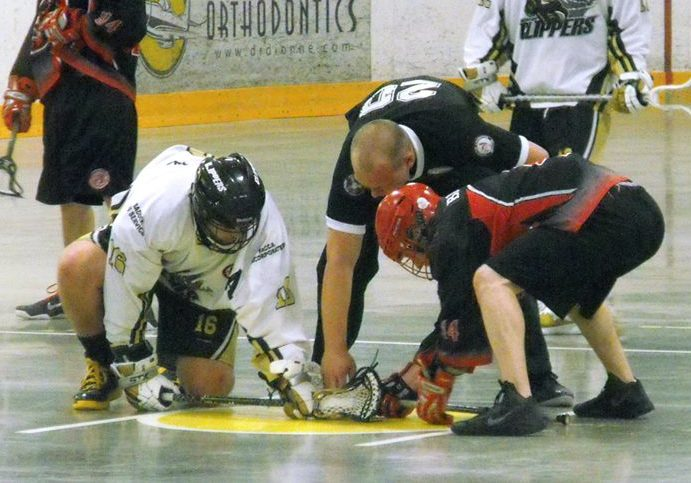
Referee placing the ball while opponents line up for a face-off.

Each period, and after each goal scored, play is restarted with a face-off. If a ball travels over the boards and outside of the playing area, play is restarted by possession being awarded to the opposing team to that which last touched the ball.

During play, teams may substitute players in and out freely. Sometimes this is referred to as "on the fly" substitution. Substitution must occur within the designated exchange area in front of the players bench in order to be legal. The sport utilizes a shot clock and the attacking team must take a shot on goal within 30 seconds of gaining possession of the ball. In addition, players must advance the ball from their own defensive end to the offensive half of the floor within 10 seconds (8 in NLL).

=== Penalties ===
For most penalties, the offending player is sent to the penalty box and his team has to play without him and with one less player for a short amount of time. Most penalties last for two minutes unless a major penalty has been assessed. The team that has taken the penalty is said to be playing shorthanded while the other team is on the power play.

A two-minute minor penalty is often called for lesser infractions such as slashing, tripping, elbowing, roughing, too many players, illegal equipment, holding, or interference. Five-minute major penalties are called for especially violent instances of most minor infractions that result in intentional injury to an opponent, as well as for fighting. Players are released from the penalty box when either the penalty time expires, or the opposition scores a goal (or three goals for the instance of a major penalty).

At the officials' discretion a ten-minute misconduct penalty may be assessed. These are served in full by the penalized player, but his team may immediately substitute another player on the playing area unless a minor or major penalty is assessed in conjunction with the misconduct (a "two-and-ten" or "five-and-ten"). In that case, the team designates another player to serve the minor or major; both players go to the penalty box, but only the designee may not be replaced, and he is released upon the expiration of the two or five minutes. In addition, game misconducts are assessed for deliberate intent to inflict severe injury on an opponent. A player who receives a game misconduct is ejected and may not return to play. Receiving two major penalties in a game risks a game misconduct.

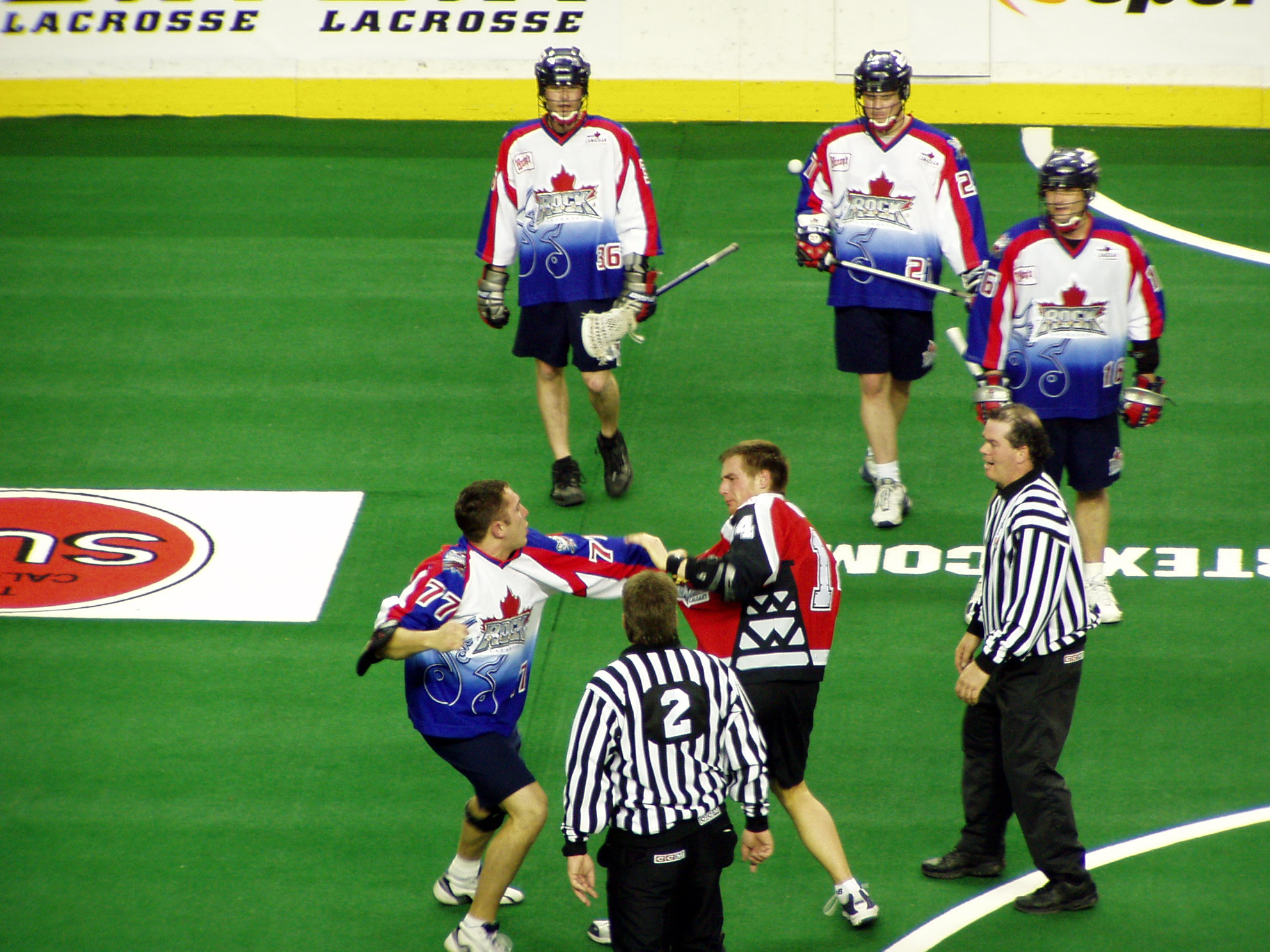
A fight during a lacrosse game between two players on the Toronto Rock and Calgary Roughnecks

A penalty shot, where a player from the non-offending team is given an attempt to score a goal without opposition from any defending players except the goaltender, may be awarded under certain circumstances. By rule, teams must have at least three runners in play. If a team commits a third penalty resulting in a "three man down" situation a penalty shot is awarded in favour of having the offending player serve in the penalty box. A penalty shot may also be awarded, at the referee's discretion, if a defensive player causes a foul to prevent a goal (by throwing his stick, holding, tripping, or by deliberately displacing the goal, or a defensive player intentionally falls and covers a ball in his own team's crease). In the NLL, a penalty shot is awarded against any team taking a too-many-men penalty in the final two minutes of the game or overtime.

==== Fighting ====
Similar to fighting in ice hockey, fighting is tolerated in professional box lacrosse. Professional players are not automatically subject to ejection, but incur a five-minute major penalty. In Canadian Lacrosse Association play, players are assessed a five-minute major penalty plus a game misconduct. Fighting in youth or club level box lacrosse is typically penalized with expulsion and suspensions. In 1990, when the Six Nations created the new Mohawk lacrosse league, fighting was specifically targeted as unacceptable. Violators were ejected from the game in which the altercation occurred and given a minimum three-game suspension.

== International competition ==
Box lacrosse is the most popular version of the sport in the Czech Republic. It is also played to a marginal degree in Australia, primarily by players who have played field lacrosse. Club level box lacrosse leagues in the United States have increased the number of players exposed to the sport, including the: Baltimore Indoor Lacrosse League, the Philadelphia Box Lacrosse Association, and the Metro Area Box Lacrosse League.

The first world championship of box lacrosse, "The Nations in 1980", was staged in several arenas in British Columbia, Canada in July 1980 involving teams representing the United States, Australia, Canada East, Canada West and the Iroquois Nationals. Canada West (Coquitlam Adanacs) defeated the Iroquois in the nationally televised world championship game from Pacific Coliseum in Vancouver. This was the first time in history that competitors from the Indigenous peoples of the Americas represented themselves in an athletic world championship competition, something that continues with the Iroquois, now known as the Haudenosaunee Nationals, competing in every championship since 2003.

The second international box lacrosse tournament was held in 2003, with the inaugural World Indoor Lacrosse Championships. The competitors were national teams from Australia, Canada, the Czech Republic, the Iroquois Nationals, Scotland, and the United States.

The 2015 WILC was hosted by the Onondaga Nation in the United States which marks the first time an international sporting event has been held on indigenous land. Thirteen teams competed in the championship: Australia, Canada, Czech Republic, England, Finland, Germany, Iroquois Nationals, Ireland, Israel, Serbia, Switzerland, Turkey, and the United States.

Canada, Iroquois Nationals and the United States have won gold, silver, and bronze respectively in each of the World Indoor Lacrosse Championships held. Canada has yet to lose an international game in box lacrosse.

Other international tournaments have been played. Annually, the European Lacrosse Federation holds the Aleš Hřebeský Memorial tournament in Prague. This is the largest European box lacrosse tournament. In 2002 and 2004, the Heritage Cup was played between the United States and Canada featuring mostly players that were members of NLL teams.

The North American Invitational is an annual tournament played in New York State featuring international teams. The 2026 Traditions Cup was the inaugural running of a new invitational tournament run by the NAI. Club24Heat, from the Kahnawà:ke Reserve, won the men's division. Israel won the women's division, and the Snake Island Muskies won the junior competition.

== Women ==
Historically, box lacrosse has been exclusively a men's sport. Women who played the sport of lacrosse typically played the women's field lacrosse version. Recently, Ontario, Alberta, Nova Scotia and British Columbia have established girls' and women's box lacrosse leagues. The first Women's World Championships was held in 2024 alongside the Men's tournament in Utica, New York. The United States defeated Canada in the final.

During the 2003 NLL season, goaltender Ginny Capicchioni appeared in two preseason and one regular season games to become the only woman to make an appearance in the NLL.

Women's Box Lacrosse (News and Articles)

== See also ==
- Lacrosse in Canada
- Major Indoor Lacrosse League/National Lacrosse League (1997–present)
- Major Series Lacrosse (1887–present)
- Sports in Canada
- Western Lacrosse Association (1932–present)
- IBLA -USA
- Hudson Valley Box Lacrosse League / Rockland County, New York
- Professional Box Lacrosse Association (2022–2023)
- NABLL- North American Box Lacrosse League- USA (2021–present)
