= Denver Outlaws (2006–2020) =

Major League Lacrosse team

- Sport: Lacrosse
- Founded: 2006
- Folded: 2020
- League: MLL
- Based in: Denver, Colorado
- Stadium: Empower Field at Mile High
- Colors: Black, orange, silver
- Owner: Estate of Pat Bowlen
- Head coach: Tony Seaman
- General manager: Jon Cohen
- Championships: 3 (2014, 2016, 2018)

The Denver Outlaws were a Major League Lacrosse professional men's field lacrosse team based in Denver, Colorado, United States. They began playing in the MLL in 2006 as an expansion team.

During their time in the MLL, the Outlaws played in the championship game a league-record ten times. Missed the playoffs just once in franchise history and never had a losing season. The Outlaws regularly posted the highest attendance in the league. The Outlaws won their first MLL Championship on August 23, 2014, defeating the Rochester Rattlers 12-11 and won their second MLL Championship in 2016, defeating the Ohio Machine 19–18. On August 18, 2018, the Outlaws won their third championship by defeating the Dallas Rattlers, 16–12.

== Franchise history ==
=== MLL expands west ===
The Outlaws had their inaugural game on May 20, 2006, versus the Chicago Machine at Sports Authority Field at Mile High. It was played in front of a Major League Lacrosse record crowd of 13,167 (but was broken again later that year at another Denver home game which drew 15,981), where the Outlaws won 24–14. The Outlaws won the Western Conference championship in their first season.

On June 16, 2007, the Rochester Rattlers won a game in overtime 27–26 over the Outlaws in the highest scoring game in MLL history at Sports Authority Field at Mile High.

Denver hosted the 2008 Major League Lacrosse All-Star Game in front of 10,124 people, with the Western Conference defeating the Eastern Conference 31–15.

In 2012, behind the strong veteran play of MLL MVP Brendan Mundorf and Defensive Player of the Year Lee Zink, Denver capped their regular season with a 15–13 victory over Chesapeake to finish the year with an 11–3 record, which represented the most wins in team history for a single season. Additionally, Denver entered the postseason as the No. 1 seed for the second time in franchise history and first time since 2009.

During Championship Weekend in Boston, the Outlaws trailed 12–3 to Long Island with 11:32 to play in the third quarter. It appeared as if Denver's record-setting season had reached its end. Yet, that's when Denver set another record with a 10–0 run to end the game, catapulting the franchise into the Steinfeld Cup title game with a 13–12 victory over Long Island. Unfortunately, in the title game versus Chesapeake, the Outlaws were unable to muster that same kind of comeback magic and fell to the Bayhawks 16–6, falling one win short of their first MLL Championship.

In 2013 the Denver Outlaws posted the first undefeated regular season (14-0) in MLL history after beating the Hamilton Nationals 18–12 to finish the season. But they fell to the Charlotte Hounds in the semifinal the next week, as their first Steinfeld Cup continued to be elusive.

=== Championship breakthroughs ===
BJ O'Hara took over as head coach for the 2014 season. That year, the Outlaws posted a 9–5 record and won their first Steinfeld Cup as the second seed. They defeated the New York Lizards in the semifinals, 14–13, in the first ever home playoff game in Denver. On August 23, the Outlaws defeated the top-seeded Rochester Rattlers 12–11 to win their first MLL Championship in the team's 9-year history, thanks to a go-ahead Drew Snider goal with 56 seconds remaining. In 2015, however, the Outlaws missed the postseason for the first time ever in franchise history after posting a 7–7 record (also their worst record in franchise history).

The 2016 season saw the Outlaws get out to their worst start in franchise history at 2–6. After trading John Grant Jr. to the Ohio Machine, they won their last six games of the regular season to be one of the seven teams in the league to finish 8–6. With the tiebreaker procedures, they ended up with the third seed and faced the Lizards in the semifinals. In Fairfield, Connecticut, the Outlaws defeated the Lizards, 20–17. The next week, they faced the top-seeded Machine, featuring John Grant Jr. Two weeks prior, Grant Jr. scored an MLL-record 10 goals in the final week of the regular season to secure a playoff spot for the Ohio Machine. In the championship game, the Outlaws fell behind the Machine, 9–3 in Atlanta. Lightning delayed the game for 97 minutes, and the Outlaws scored the next four goals to cut the deficit to 9–7. The Machine came back with five straight and Denver went into the locker room trailing 14–7, at halftime. The Outlaws roared back to tie the score at 15 by the start of the final quarter, before Eric Law scored a go-ahead goal with 12.9 seconds left. The Outlaws shutdown the Machine's last scoring threat and claimed their second Steinfeld Cup victory in three years.

The Outlaws returned to the big game in 2017, where they again faced the Machine. The Outlaws led for most of the game by as many as four goals when the score reached 10–6 with three minutes left in the third. However, after taking a 12–10 lead with 10:30 to go in the game, they gave up seven straight goals and lose their fifth championship game in their seventh appearance, 17–12, allowing the Machine to win their franchise's first title.

Much like their 2016 championship season, the 2018 Outlaws struggled out of the gate. On Mother's Day, the Outlaws dropped a 24-22 barnburner to the Chesapeake Bayhawks in front of 1,788 fans at Mile High. But the resilient Outlaws rattled off six straight victories ending with a 25-11 blowout of Boston at their annual Fourth of July game in front of 29,973 fans. The team finished 8-6 and in third place.

Despite getting swept by the Bayhawks 2–0 in the regular season, the Outlaws would go to Annapolis and get a gutsy 13–12 victory in the league semifinals. The following week in Charleston, South Carolina, the Outlaws would face the Dallas Rattlers, who also swept them in the regular season, for the 2018 Steinfeld Cup. Denver would use a 7–0 run in the second and third quarters, and a nine-point performance from Matt Kavanagh to defeat Dallas, 16-12 for their third championship in five years. Rookie Chris Cloutier won Rookie of the Year for the 2018 season.

After the departure of over 140 MLL players to the new Premier Lacrosse League attributed to the contraction of the league from nine to six teams, the Outlaws posted a 9–7 record in 2019. Despite tying their franchise record for most losses in a season, with the longer regular season the Outlaws claimed the second seed heading to the championship weekend, which would be played in Denver for the first time. Although the Outlaws rallied to defeat the Boston Cannons, 17–15 in the semifinal, they were not able to ride the homefield advantage to their fourth title. The Chesapeake Bayhawks left Denver as victors, 10–9, after scoring two goals in the last three minutes.

The 2020 season was shortened due to the COVID-19 pandemic and quarantined at Navy-Marine Corps Memorial Stadium in Annapolis, home to the Chesapeake Bayhawks. In a five-game regular season, the Outlaws stormed to a 4–0 start highlighted by an 18-6 throttling of the new Connecticut Hammerheads and a 13–12 overtime victory over the defending champion Bayhawks. They entered the postseason as the top seed. However, on the last night of the regular season, a Bayhawks player tested positive for COVID-19. The semifinal game between the second-seeded Hammerheads and third-seeded Bayhawks was canceled as both teams withdrew from the tournament. As a result, the semifinal between the Outlaws and the Boston Cannons was moved to the next day to serve as the championship. In their league-record tenth championship appearance, the Outlaws fell to the Cannons, 13–10.

=== Ceased operations ===
On December 16, 2020, the Premier Lacrosse League (PLL) announced a merger with Major League Lacrosse. The move created a unified outdoor lacrosse league that kept the PLL name and eliminated all home market teams. This left six MLL franchises, including Denver, on the outside. The league retained the rights to the now-retired team identities with the option to use these brands in future expansion.

== General Managers ==
- General manager - Jon Cohen

== Current coaching staff ==
- Head coach - Tony Seaman
- Offensive coordinator - John Grant Jr.
- Defensive coordinator - Matt Bocklet
- Strength and conditioning Coach - Chris Spangler

=== All-time head coaches ===
| # | Name | Term | Regular season | | | | Playoffs | | | |
| # | Name | Term | GC | W | L | W% | GC | W | L | W% |
|---|---|---|---|---|---|---|---|---|---|---|
| 1 | Jarred Testa | 2006 | 12 | 10 | 2 | .833 | 2 | 1 | 1 | .500 |
| 2 | Jim Beardsmore | 2007 | 4 | 1 | 3 | .250 | - | - | - | - |
| 3 | Brian Reese | 2007–2011 | 56 | 38 | 18 | .679 | 7 | 2 | 5 | .286 |
| 4 | Jim Stagnitta | 2012–2013 | 28 | 25 | 3 | .893 | 3 | 1 | 2 | .333 |
| 5 | B.J. O'Hara | 2014–2018 | 70 | 41 | 29 | .586 | 7 | 6 | 1 | .857 |
| 6 | Tony Seaman | 2019-2020 | 21 | 13 | 8 | .619 | 3 | 1 | 2 | .333 |

== Roster ==
2020 Denver Outlaws
| Number | Player's Name | Nationality | Position | Height | Weight | College |
|---|---|---|---|---|---|---|
| 2 | Kyle Pless | (United States) | D | 5 ft 10 in | 178 lb | Rutgers |
| 4 | Brian Begley | (United States) | M | 5 ft 10 in | 185 lb | Loyola |
| 5 | Will Snider | (United States) | M | 6 ft 2 in | 220 lb | Maryland |
| 9 | Max Adler (C) | (Israel) | FO | 5 ft 10 in | 180 lb | Bentley |
| 10 | Colton Jackson | (United States) | M | 6 ft 1 in | 200 lb | Denver |
| 12 | Andrew Newbold | (United States) | D | 6 ft 3 in | 210 lb | Sacred Heart |
| 18 | Nick Washuta | (United States) | G | 6 ft 3 in | 195 lb | Vermont |
| 20 | Chase Caruso | (United States) | LSM | 5 ft 11 in | 180 lb | Sacred Heart |
| 21 | Garrett Michaeli | (United States) | D | 6 ft 3 in | 205 lb | Rutgers |
| 22 | Michael Rexrode (C) | (United States) | D | 6 ft 0 in | 180 lb | Rutgers |
| 23 | Charlie Hayes | (United States) | M | 5 ft 11 in | 180 lb | Detroit |
| 24 | John Grant Jr. | (Canada) | A | 6 ft 2 in | 220 lb | Delaware |
| 32 | Sean Mayle | (United States) | LSM | 6 ft 1 in | 200 lb | Denver |
| 34 | Dylan Jinks | (United States) | A | 5 ft 10 in | 190 lb | Hartford |
| 38 | Casey Dowd | (United States) | FO | 5 ft 9 in | 220 lb | Siena |
| 40 | Christian Knight | (United States) | G | 6 ft 1 in | 195 lb | Cornell |
| 43 | Miles Silva | (United States) | A | 6 ft 4 in | 225 lb | Army |
| 45 | Ryan Lee | (Canada) | A | 6 ft 2 in | 200 lb | RIT |
| 46 | Tom Rigney | (United States) | D | 6 ft 3 in | 225 lb | Army |
| 50 | Jack Jasinski | (United States) | M | 5 ft 7 in | 165 lb | Ohio State |
| 57 | Chris Aslanian | (United States) | A | 6 ft 3 in | 190 lb | Hobart |
| 59 | Mikie Schlosser (C) | (United States) | M | 6 ft 2 in | 180 lb | Michigan |
| 68 | Taylor Stuart | (Canada) | D | 6 ft 0 in | 185 lb | Bellarmine |
| 77 | Daniel Bucaro | (United States) | A | 6 ft 2 in | 195 lb | Georgetown |
| 80 | James Burr | (United States) | A | 6 ft 0 in | 190 lb | Boston University |
| 88 | Pat Aslanian | (United States) | M | 6 ft 2 in | 205 lb | Notre Dame |

(C)- captain

- As of 12 July 2020

=== MLL Award winners ===
Most Valuable Player

- Brendan Mundorf: 2012

Rookie of the Year

- Dan Hardy: 2009
- Jack Kelly: 2016
- Chris Cloutier: 2018

Coach of the Year

- Brian Reese: 2009
- Jim Stagnitta: 2013
- Tony Seaman: 2019

Defensive Player of the Year

- Lee Zink: 2012, 2013

Offensive Player of the Year

- Eric Law: 2017

Goalie of the Year

- Jesse Schwartzman: 2013
- Jack Kelly: 2017

Most Improved Player

- Jeremy Sieverts: 2012
- Drew Snider: 2013

=== Retired numbers ===
- 19 - Jesse Schwartzman
- 29 - Lee Zink
- 7 - Matt Bocklet

== Season by season ==
Denver Outlaws
| Year | W | L | % | Regular season finish | Playoffs |
| 2006 | 10 | 2 | .883 | 1st in Western Conference | Won semifinal 23–14 over San Francisco Dragons; Lost championship 23–12 to Philadelphia Barrage |
| 2007 | 7 | 5 | .583 | 2nd in Western Conference | Lost semifinal 13-12 (OT) to Philadelphia Barrage |
| 2008 | 8 | 4 | .667 | 1st in Western Conference | Won semifinal 13–12 over Los Angeles Riptide; Lost championship 16–6 to Rochester Rattlers |
| 2009 | 9 | 3 | .750 | 1st in Division | Won semifinal over Boston Cannons 11-10; Lost championship to Toronto Nationals 10-9 |
| 2010 | 8 | 4 | .667 | 2nd in League | Lost semifinal to Long Island Lizards 16-12 |
| 2011 | 7 | 5 | .583 | 2nd in League | Lost semifinal to Hamilton Nationals 9-11 |
| 2012 | 11 | 3 | .786 | 1st in League | Won semifinal vs Long Island Lizards 13-12; Lost championship 16–6 to Chesapeake Bayhawks |
| 2013 | 14 | 0 | 1.000 | 1st in League | Lost semifinal vs. Charlotte Hounds 17-14 |
| 2014 | 9 | 5 | .643 | 2nd in League | Won semifinal vs New York Lizards 14-13; Won championship vs. Rochester Rattlers 12-11 |
| 2015 | 7 | 7 | .500 | 5th in League | Did not Qualify |
| 2016 | 8 | 6 | .571 | 3rd in League | Won semifinal vs New York Lizards 20-17; Won championship vs. Ohio Machine 19-18 |
| 2017 | 9 | 5 | .643 | 1st in League | Won semifinal vs Rochester Rattlers 15-8; Lost championship vs Ohio Machine 12-17 |
| 2018 | 8 | 6 | .571 | 3rd in League | Won semifinal vs. Chesapeake Bayhawks 13-12; Won championship vs. Dallas Rattlers 16-12 |
| 2019 | 9 | 7 | .563 | 2nd in League | Won semifinal vs. Boston Cannons 17-15; Lost championship vs. Chesapeake Bayhawks 9-10 |
| 2020 | 4 | 1 | .800 | 1st in League | Lost championship vs. Boston Cannons 10-13 |
| Totals | 128 | 63 | .670 | | Total Playoff Record 12 - 11; Playoff Win % = .522 |

- 2008 Denver Outlaws season
- 2010 Denver Outlaws season
- 2012 Denver Outlaws season
- 2014 Denver Outlaws season
- 2015 Denver Outlaws season
- 2016 Denver Outlaws season
- 2020 Denver Outlaws season

== Draft history ==
- 2006: Geoff Snider, Denver (17th overall); Brett Moyer, Hofstra (18th overall); Sean McCarthy, Hofstra (43rd overall)
- 2007: Drew Westervelt, UMBC (4th overall)
- 2008: Dan Cocoziello, Princeton (13th overall); Mike Ward, Duke (27th overall); Peter Striebel, Princeton (47th overall)
- 2009: Max Seibald, Cornell (2nd overall); Shane Walterhoefer, North Carolina (7th overall); Dan Hardy, Syracuse (8th overall)
- 2010: Ken Clausen, Virginia (5th overall)
- 2011: Billy Bitter, North Carolina (3rd overall)
- 2012: Mark Matthews, Denver (4th overall); Colin Briggs, Virginia
- 2013: Brian Megill, Syracuse (7th overall)
- 2014: Jeremy Noble, Denver (6th overall)
- 2015: Nikko Pontrello, Loyola (8th overall)
- 2016: Matt Kavanagh, Notre Dame (5th overall)
- 2017: Zach Currier, Princeton (6th overall)
- 2018: Connor Keating, Penn (8th overall)
