= List of Major League Lacrosse awards =

Major League Lacrosse (MLL) was a professional men's field lacrosse league consisting of nine teams in the United States. Since the league's first season in 2001, the MLL gave several annual awards to players and coaches.

== Most Valuable Player ==
Year	Player	Team	Position
2001	Ryan Powell	Rochester Rattlers	Attack
2002	Greg Cattrano	Baltimore Bayhawks	Goaltender
2003	Jay Jalbert	Long Island Lizards	Midfielder
2004	Conor Gill	Boston Cannons	Attack
2005	Gary Gait	Baltimore Bayhawks	Attack
2005	Mark Millon	Boston Cannons	Attack
2006	Ryan Powell	San Francisco Dragons	Attack
2007	John Grant Jr.	Rochester Rattlers	Attack
2008	John Grant Jr.	Rochester Rattlers	Attack
2009	Paul Rabil	Boston Cannons	Midfielder
2010	Matt Poskay	Boston Cannons	Attack
2011	Paul Rabil	Boston Cannons	Midfielder
2012	Brendan Mundorf	Denver Outlaws	Attack
2013	Kevin Crowley	Hamilton Nationals	Midfielder
2014	Casey Powell	Florida Launch	Attack
2015	Greg Gurenlian	New York Lizards	Face-off
2016	Tom Schreiber	Ohio Machine	Midfielder
2017	Tom Schreiber	Ohio Machine	Midfielder
2018	Rob Pannell	New York Lizards	Attack
2019	Lyle Thompson	Chesapeake Bayhawks	Attack
2020	Bryce Wasserman	Boston Cannons	Attack

== Offensive Player of the Year ==
Year	Player	Team	Position
2001	John Grant, Jr. (1)	Rochester Rattlers	Attack
2002	Mark Millon (1)	Baltimore Bayhawks	Attack
2003	Mark Millon (2)	Baltimore Bayhawks	Attack
2004	Blake Miller	Philadelphia Barrage	Midfielder
2005	Casey Powell (1)	Rochester Rattlers	Attack
2006	Ryan Powell	San Francisco Dragons	Attack
2007	John Grant, Jr. (2)	Rochester Rattlers	Attack
2008	John Grant, Jr. (3)	Rochester Rattlers	Attack
2009	Paul Rabil (1)	Boston Cannons	Midfielder
2010	Matt Poskay	Boston Cannons	Attack
2011	Paul Rabil (2)	Boston Cannons	Midfielder
2012	Paul Rabil (3)	Boston Cannons	Midfielder
2013	Kevin Crowley	Hamilton Nationals	Midfielder
2014	Casey Powell (2)	Florida Launch	Attack
2015	Jordan Wolf	Rochester Rattlers	Attack
2016	Rob Pannell (1)	New York Lizards	Attack
2017	Eric Law	Denver Outlaws	Attack
2018	Rob Pannell (2)	New York Lizards	Attack
2019	Lyle Thompson	Chesapeake Bayhawks	Attack

== Defensive Player of the Year ==
Year	Player	Team
2001	Rob Doerr	Baltimore Bayhawks
2002	Christian Cook	New Jersey Pride
2003	Ryan Curtis	Boston Cannons
2004	Nicky Polanco	Philadelphia Barrage
2005	Nicky Polanco	Long Island Lizards
2006	Brodie Merrill	Rochester Rattlers
2007	Brodie Merrill	Rochester Rattlers
2008	Brodie Merrill	Rochester Rattlers
2009	Brodie Merrill	Toronto Nationals
2010	Brodie Merrill	Toronto Nationals
2011	Brodie Merrill	Hamilton Nationals
2012	Lee Zink	Denver Outlaws
2013	Lee Zink	Denver Outlaws
2014	Mike Manley	Rochester Rattlers
2015	Joe Fletcher	New York Lizards
2016	Mike Manley	Rochester Rattlers
2016	Joel White	Rochester Rattlers
2017	Tucker Durkin	Florida Launch
2018	Matt Dunn	Dallas Rattlers
2019	Liam Byrnes	Atlanta Blaze
2020	Zach Goodrich	Boston Cannons

== Goaltender of the Year ==
Year	Player	Team
2001	Greg Cattrano	Baltimore Bayhawks
2002	Greg Cattrano	Baltimore Bayhawks
2003	Brian Dougherty	Long Island Lizards
2004	Greg Cattrano	Philadelphia Barrage
2005	Chris Garrity	Boston Cannons
2006	Brian Dougherty	Philadelphia Barrage
2007	Brian Dougherty	Philadelphia Barrage
2008	Mickey Jarboe	Los Angeles Riptide
2009	Jesse Schwartzman	Denver Outlaws
2010	Kip Turner	Boston Cannons
2011	Drew Adams	Long Island Lizards
2012	Drew Adams	Long Island Lizards
2013	Jesse Schwartzman	Denver Outlaws
2014	John Galloway	Rochester Rattlers
2015	Drew Adams	New York Lizards
2016	John Galloway	Rochester Rattlers
2017	Jack Kelly	Denver Outlaws
2018	John Galloway	Dallas Rattlers
2018	Niko Amato	Chesapeake Bayhawks
2019	Sean Sconone	Dallas Rattlers
2020	Sean Sconone	Connecticut Hammerheads

== Rookie of the Year ==
Year	Player	Team	Position
2001	Keith Cromwell	Bridgeport Barrage	Attack
2002	Conor Gill	Boston Cannons	Attack
2003	Adam Doneger	Rochester Rattlers	Midfielder
2004	Ryan Boyle	Philadelphia Barrage	Attack
2005	Brodie Merrill	Baltimore Bayhawks	Defenseman
2006	Matt Ward	Baltimore Bayhawks	Attack
2007	Alex Smith	Rochester Rattlers	Midfielder
2008	Kevin Huntley	Los Angeles Riptide	Attack
2009	Dan Hardy	Denver Outlaws	Midfielder
2010	Ned Crotty	Chicago Machine	Attack
2011	Jeremy Boltus	Hamilton Nationals	Attack
2012	Matt Gibson	Long Island Lizards	Attack
2013	Rob Pannell	New York Lizards	Attack
2014	Kieran McArdle	Florida Launch	Attack
2015	Joey Sankey	Charlotte Hounds	Attack
2016	Jack Kelly	Denver Outlaws	Goalie
2017	Josh Byrne	Chesapeake Bayhawks	Attack
2018	Chris Cloutier	Denver Outlaws	Attack
2019	Alex Woodall	Atlanta Blaze	Face-off
2020	Daniel Bucaro	Denver Outlaws	Attack

== Coach of the Year ==
Year	Coach	Team
2001	John DeTommaso	Long Island Lizards
2002	Scott Hiller	Boston Cannons
2003	Ted Georgalas	New Jersey Pride
2004	Sal LoCascio	Philadelphia Barrage
2005	Scott Hiller	Boston Cannons
2006	Tony Resch	Philadelphia Barrage
2007	John Tucker	Los Angeles Riptide
2008	Tony Resch	Philadelphia Barrage
2009	Brian Reese	Denver Outlaws
2010	Jim Mule	Long Island Lizards
2011	Bill Daye	Boston Cannons
2012	Joe Spallina	Long Island Lizards
2013	Jim Stagnitta	Denver Outlaws
2014	Tim Soudan	Rochester Rattlers
2015	John Tucker	Boston Cannons
2016	Jim Stagnitta	Charlotte Hounds
2017	Tom Mariano	Florida Launch
2018	Bill Warder	Dallas Rattlers
2019	Tony Seaman	Denver Outlaws
2020	Sean Quirk	Boston Cannons

== Man of the Year Award ==
Year	Player	Team	Position
2018	Scott Ratliff	Atlanta Blaze	Defenseman
2019	Nick Marrocco	Boston Cannons	Goalie

Named in honor of David Huntley, the former MLL coach for the Atlanta Blaze, Hamilton Nationals, Toronto Nationals, and Chesapeake Bayhawks, who died in December 2017, the award will be presented to the lacrosse athlete who has demonstrated, "sportsmanship and professionalism that are beyond reproach" and who "makes selfless, meaningful contributions to Major League Lacrosse, the game of lacrosse, and to his community."

== Iron Lizard Award ==
Year	Player	Team	Position
2001	Joe Ghedina	Long Island Lizards	Midfielder
2002	Paul Cantabene	Baltimore Bayhawks	Midfielder
2003	Jon Hess	New Jersey Pride	Attack

Major League Lacrosse's SoBe Iron Lizard Award was given to the player who most embodied the traits of toughness, tenacity and determination regardless of pain or injury during season. The award was discontinued after 2003.

== Sportsman of the Year ==
Year	Player	Team	Position
2004	Kevin Finneran	Long Island Lizards	Midfielder
2005	Pat McCabe	Long Island Lizards	Defenseman
2006	Michael Culver	Chicago Machine	Defenseman
2007	Greg Bice	Los Angeles Riptide	Defenseman
2008	Tom Zummo	Boston Cannons	Midfielder
2009	Tim Goettelmann	Long Island Lizards	Attack
2010	Tim Goettelmann	Long Island Lizards	Attack
2011	Greg Bice	Rochester Rattlers	Defenseman

The Sportsman of the Year award was discontinued after 2011.

== Most Improved Player of the Year ==
Year	Player	Team	Position
2005	Andrew Combs	Rochester Rattlers	Attack
2006	John Christmas	Boston Cannons	Attack
2007	Spencer Ford	Los Angeles Riptide	Attack
2008	Merrick Thomson	New Jersey Pride	Attack
2009	Chris Eck	Boston Cannons	Midfielder
2010	Peet Poillon	Chesapeake Bayhawks	Midfielder
2011	Stephen Peyser	Long Island Lizards	Midfielder
2012	Jeremy Sieverts	Denver Outlaws	Midfielder
2013	Drew Snider	Denver Outlaws	Midfielder
2014	Justin Turri	Rochester Rattlers	Midfielder
2015	Davey Emala	Boston Cannons	Midfielder
2016	Mike Chanenchuk	Charlotte Hounds	Midfielder
2017	Kyle Bernlohr	Ohio Machine	Goalie

Discontinued after 2017.

== Community Service Award ==
Year	Player	Team	Position
2005	Ryan McClay	New Jersey Pride	Defenseman

Major League Lacrosse's Starbucks Community Service Award. Awarded only in 2005.
