= 2007 World Indoor Lacrosse Championship =

Tournament details
- Host country: Canada
- Venue: Halifax Metro Centre
- Dates: May 14–20
- Teams: 8

Final positions
- Champions: Canada (2nd title)
- Runners-up: Haudenosaunee
- Third place: United States
- Fourth place: England

Tournament statistics
- Games played: 20

The 2007 World Indoor Lacrosse Championship was the second World Indoor Lacrosse Championship, an international box lacrosse tournament organized by the Federation of International Lacrosse every four years. It took place between May 14 and 20 at the Halifax Metro Centre in Halifax, Nova Scotia, Canada. Canada was the defending champion and again beat the Iroquois Nationals in the final, this time 15–14 in overtime. Eight nations took part in this event, the six nations from the 2003 WILC and two newcomers - England and Ireland. There was an estimated 850,000 television viewers of the tournament in Canada and the games were streamed live in Europe.

== Venue ==
| Halifax, Nova Scotia | 2007 WILC in Halifax, Nova Scotia, Canada |
|---|---|
| Halifax Metro Centre | 2007 WILC in Halifax, Nova Scotia, Canada |
| Capacity: 10,595 | 2007 WILC in Halifax, Nova Scotia, Canada |
| 44.64833°N 63.57667°W | 2007 WILC in Halifax, Nova Scotia, Canada |

== Pool play ==
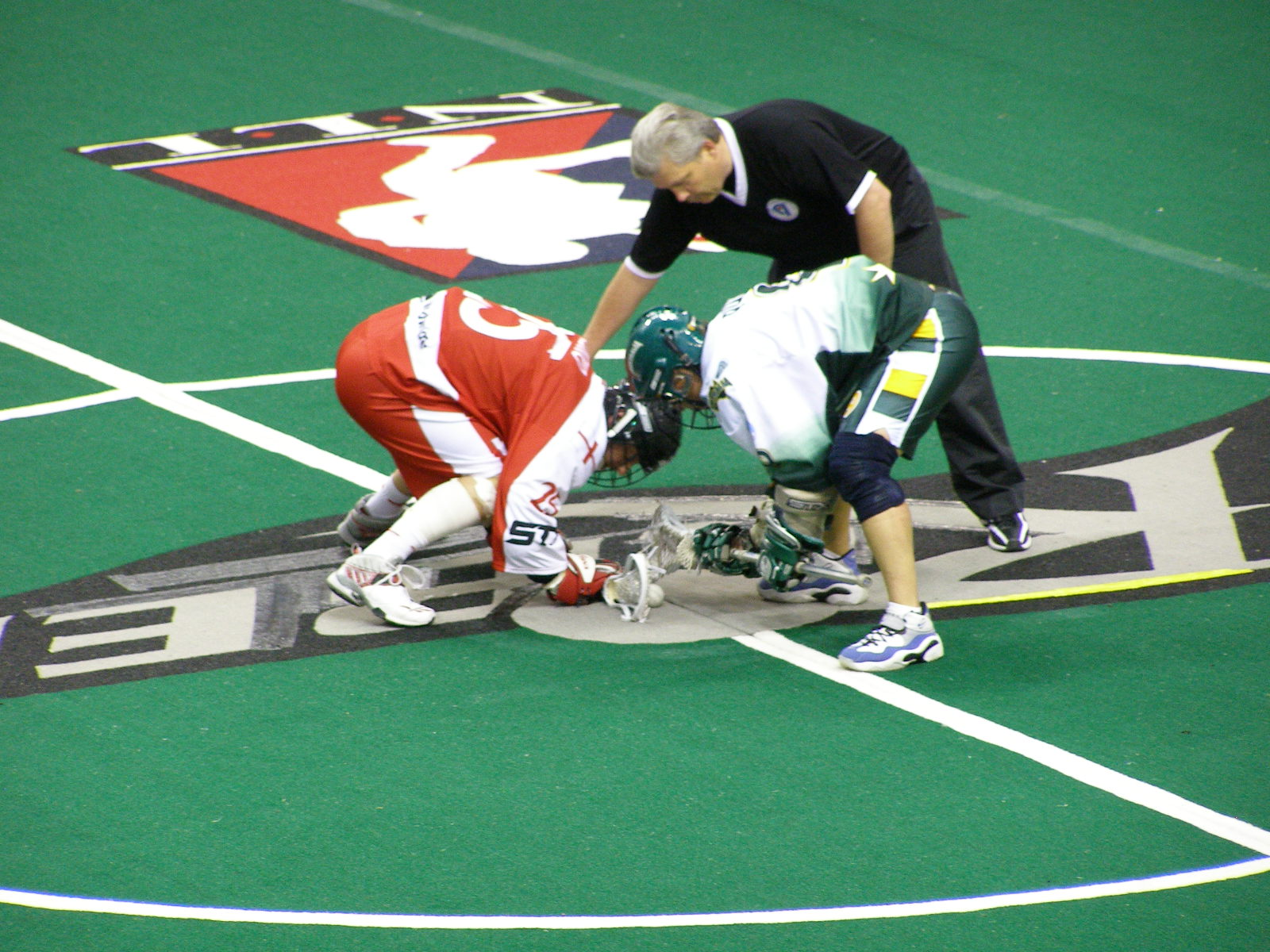
England vs. Australia

The eight participating teams were placed in two groups. After playing a round-robin, the first place team in each group advanced to the semi-finals, the second and third placed teams advanced to the quarter-finals, and the fourth place teams advanced to the 7th place game.

As predicted, both Canada and Iroquois went through the round-robin with three comfortable wins. Both Ireland and the Czech Republic finished winless, but the Czechs showed a lot of enthusiasm and had two very narrow defeats against England and Scotland. By contrast, Scotland failed to repeat their impressive results from 2003.

=== Pool A ===
| Team | GP | W | L | GF | GA | DIF | PTS | Advanced to |
|---|---|---|---|---|---|---|---|---|
| Canada | 3 | 3 | 0 | 67 | 10 | +57 | 3 | Semi-finals |
| United States | 3 | 2 | 1 | 44 | 27 | +17 | 2 | Quarter-finals |
| Australia | 3 | 1 | 2 | 27 | 51 | −24 | 1 | Quarter-finals |
| Ireland | 3 | 0 | 3 | 9 | 59 | −50 | 0 | 7th place games |

| United States | 19–9 | Australia | Halifax Metro Centre, Halifax |

| Ireland | 1–25 | Canada | Halifax Metro Centre, Halifax |

| Ireland | 0–20 | United States | Halifax Metro Centre, Halifax |

| Canada | 24–4 | Australia | Halifax Metro Centre, Halifax |

| Australia | 14–8 | Ireland | Halifax Metro Centre, Halifax |

| Canada | 18–5 | United States | Halifax Metro Centre, Halifax |

=== Pool B ===
| Team | GP | W | L | GF | GA | DIF | PTS | Advanced to |
|---|---|---|---|---|---|---|---|---|
| Haudenosaunee | 3 | 3 | 0 | 70 | 16 | +54 | 3 | Semi-finals |
| England | 3 | 2 | 1 | 32 | 41 | -9 | 2 | Quarter-finals |
| Scotland | 3 | 1 | 2 | 22 | 43 | −21 | 1 | Quarter-finals |
| Czech Republic | 3 | 0 | 3 | 20 | 44 | −24 | 0 | 7th place games |

| 14 May 2007 | Haudenosaunee | 27–8 | England | Halifax Metro Centre, Halifax |

| 14 May 2007 | Scotland | 11–9 | Czech Republic | Halifax Metro Centre, Halifax |

| 15 May 2007 | England | 15–7 | Scotland | Halifax Metro Centre, Halifax |

| 15 May 2007 | Czech Republic | 4–24 | Haudenosaunee | Halifax Metro Centre, Halifax |

| 16 May 2007 | England | 9–7 | Czech Republic | Halifax Metro Centre, Halifax |

| 16 May 2007 | Haudenosaunee | 19–4 | Scotland | Halifax Metro Centre, Halifax |

== Championship bracket ==
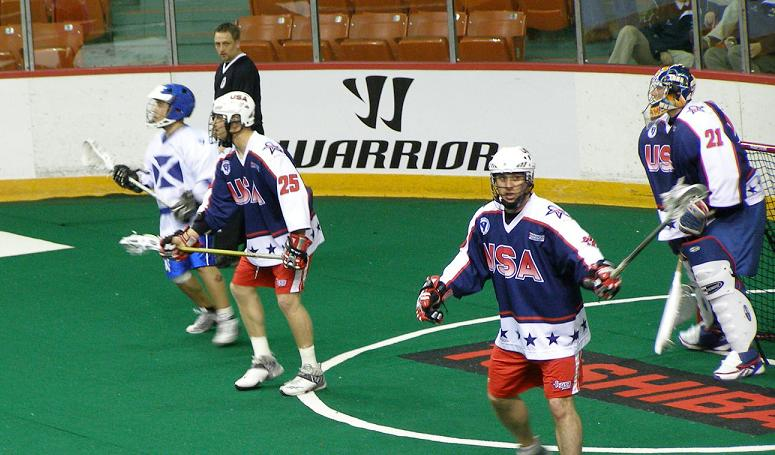
USA vs. Scotland

The final, with the expected pairing of Canada against the Iroquois Nationals, was one of the best games in box lacrosse history. Team Canada went through the first quarter with a 4–2 lead, then the Nationals were able to come back in the second and third. The Iroquois were up 10–9 at the start of the fourth quarter. Three quick Canadian goals put them in front again, but they were answered by another three goals by the Nationals. Then John Grant, Jr. scored two goals and the victory for Canada was almost secured. But Dean Hill scored in the final minute of regulation to tie it at 14, sending the championship into overtime. Thirty seconds into overtime, Jeff Zywicki scored his first goal of the game, making it 15–14 for Canada's second gold medal.

Quarter-finals
England | 15
Australia | 11
United States | 17
Scotland | 9

Semi-finals
Canada | 24
England | 9
Haudenosaunee | 14
United States | 4

Gold medal game
Canada | 15
Haudenosaunee | 14
Bronze medal game
United States | 17
England | 10

=== 7th place game ===
| 18 May 2007 | Czech Republic | 22–5 | Ireland | Halifax Metro Centre, Halifax |

=== Quarter-finals ===
| 18 May 2007 | England | 15–11 | Australia | Halifax Metro Centre, Halifax |

| 18 May 2007 | United States | 17–9 | Scotland | Halifax Metro Centre, Halifax |

=== 5th place game ===
| 19 May 2007 | Australia | 8–14 | Scotland | Halifax Metro Centre, Halifax |

=== Semi-finals ===
| 19 May 2007 | Canada | 24–9 | England | Halifax Metro Centre, Halifax |

| 19 May 2007 | Haudenosaunee | 14–4 | United States | Halifax Metro Centre, Halifax |

=== Bronze medal game ===
| 20 May 2007 | United States | 17–10 | England | Halifax Metro Centre, Halifax |

=== Gold medal game ===
| 20 May 2007 | Canada | 15–14 (OT) (4–2, 3–6, 2–2, 5–4) | Haudenosaunee | Halifax Metro Centre, Halifax |

== Final standings ==
| 1st place, gold medalist(s) | Canada |
| 2nd place, silver medalist(s) | Haudenosaunee |
| 3rd place, bronze medalist(s) | United States |
| 4 | England |
| 5 | Scotland |
| 6 | Australia |
| 7 | Czech Republic |
| 8 | Ireland |
