= 2024 World Lacrosse Box Championships =

Lacrosse competition in New York, US

Men

Tournament details
- Host country: United States
- Venues: 3 (in Utica, New York and Oneida territory host cities)
- Dates: 20-29 September 2024
- Teams: 28

Final positions
- Champions: Canada (6th title)
- Runners-up: United States
- Third place: Haudenosaunee
- Fourth place: England

Awards
- MVP: (Canada) Jeff Teat

2024 World Lacrosse Box Championships
Women

Tournament details
- Host country: United States
- Venues: 3 (in Utica, New York Oneida territory host cities)
- Dates: 20-29 September 2024
- Teams: 10

Final positions
- Champions: United States (1st title)
- Runners-up: Canada
- Third place: Haudenosaunee
- Fourth place: Australia

Awards
- MVP: (United States) Ally Kennedy

The 2024 World Lacrosse Box Championships was the sixth international men’s box lacrosse championship and first international women’s box lacrosse championship organized by World Lacrosse. It was held 20-29 September 2024 in Utica, New York, United States.

== Teams ==
Twenty-eight countries for men's teams and ten countries for women's teams competed in the 2024 World Lacrosse Box Championships.

== Men ==
=== Pool play ===
==== Pool A ====
Rank	Team	GP	W	L	GF	GA	DIF	PTS	Advanced to
1	Canada	3	3	0	46	24	22	3	Quarter-finals
2	United States	3	2	1	49	26	23	2	Quarter-finals
3	Haudenosaunee	3	1	2	37	31	6	1	Quarter-finals
4	England	3	0	3	9	60	-51	0	Quarter-finals

==== Pool B ====
Rank	Team	GP	W	L	GF	GA	DIF	PTS	Advanced to
1	Israel	3	3	0	71	18	53	3	First Round
2	Hong Kong	3	2	1	44	29	15	2	Play-In
3	Belgium	3	1	2	20	49	-29	1	13th–28th placement round
4	Mexico	3	0	3	25	64	-39	0	13th–28th placement round

==== Pool C ====
Rank	Team	GP	W	L	GF	GA	DIF	PTS	Advanced to
1	Japan	3	3	0	52	29	23	3	First Round
2	Finland	3	2	1	50	29	21	2	Play-In
3	Switzerland	3	1	2	21	45	-24	1	13th–28th placement round
4	Greece	3	0	3	23	43	-20	0	13th–28th placement round

==== Pool D ====
Rank	Team	GP	W	L	GF	GA	DIF	PTS	Advanced to
1	Czech Republic	3	3	0	65	13	52	3	First Round
2	Scotland	3	2	1	42	39	3	2	Play-In
3	Jamaica	3	1	2	28	43	-15	1	13th–28th placement round
4	Chinese Taipei	3	0	3	19	59	-40	0	13th–28th placement round

==== Pool E ====
Rank	Team	GP	W	L	GF	GA	DIF	PTS	Advanced to
1	Netherlands	3	3	0	57	35	22	3	Play-In
2	Italy	3	1	2	41	42	-1	1	Play-In
3	Austria	3	1	2	38	50	-12	1	13th–28th placement round
4	U.S. Virgin Islands	3	1	2	40	49	-9	1	13th–28th placement round

==== Pool F ====
Rank	Team	GP	W	L	GF	GA	DIF	PTS	Advanced to
1	Australia	3	3	0	60	31	29	3	Play-In
2	Slovakia	3	2	1	41	37	4	2	Play-In
3	Puerto Rico	3	1	2	40	41	-1	1	13th–28th placement round
4	Hungary	3	0	3	29	61	-32	0	13th–28th placement round

==== Pool G ====
Rank	Team	GP	W	L	GF	GA	DIF	PTS	Advanced to
1	Ireland	3	3	0	48	14	34	3	First Round
2	Germany	3	2	1	36	26	10	2	Play-In
3	China	3	1	2	26	53	-27	1	13th–28th placement round
4	Poland	3	0	3	23	40	-17	0	13th–28th placement round

- Standings
- Tie breaking procedure

=== Championship Round ===
All participating teams in Pool A are awarded the 1-4 Seeds based on the Pool A Standings. The four teams with the highest point differentials in the remaining 6 Pools were awarded the 5-8 Seeds. The 8 teams with the next highest point differentials were awarded the 9-16 Seeds.

==== Championship Bracket ====
Play-In
9 Netherlands	11
16 Italy	7
12 Hong Kong	9
13 Germany	12
10 Australia	21
15 Scotland	7
11 Finland	20
14 Slovakia	4

First Round
8 Japan	12
9 Netherlands	9
5 Czech Republic	11
13 Germany	5
7 Ireland	12
10 Australia	11
6 Israel	17
11 Finland	16

Quarter-finals
1 Canada	22
8 Japan	4
4 England	13
5 Czech Republic	8
2 United States	24
7 Ireland	6
3 Haudenosaunee	24
6 Israel	6

Semi-finals
1 Canada	20
4 England	3
2 United States	12
3 Haudenosaunee	11

Final
1 Canada	13
2 United States	7
Third place
4 England	5
3 Haudenosaunee	14

=== Placement Round ===
- Bracket
- Scores

==== 5th–8th placement ====
Teams who lose in the Quarterfinals in the playoff bracket play in the below bracket for 5th through 8th place.

5th–8th place
5	Czech Republic	10
8	Japan	8
6	Israel	15
7	Ireland	8

5th place
5	Czech Republic	10
6	Israel	18
7th place
8	Japan	14
7	Ireland	15

==== 9th–12th placement ====
Teams who lose in the First Round of the playoff bracket play in the below bracket for 9th through 11th place.

9th–12th place
10	Australia	8
11	Finland	13
9	Netherlands	9
13	Germany	13

9th place
11	Finland	17
13	Germany	15
11th place
10	Australia	13
9	Netherlands	8

==== 13th–15th placement ====
Teams who are rank 3–4 in Pool B to Pool G in the below bracket for 13th through 28th place.

13th–28th place
12	Hong Kong	13
28	Chinese Taipei	14
20	Belgium	12
21	China	16
17	Puerto Rico	11
24	Poland	17
16	Italy	15
25	Greece	9
15	Scotland	17
26	Hungary	7
18	Jamaica	18
23	U.S. Virgin Islands	19
19	Austria	10
22	Switzerland	9
14	Slovakia	18
27	Mexico	7

13th–20th place
28	Chinese Taipei	6
21	China	16
24	Poland	5
16	Italy	15
15	Scotland	15
23	U.S. Virgin Islands	16
19	Austria	7
14	Slovakia	9

13th–16th place
21	China	12
16	Italy	14
23	U.S. Virgin Islands	20
14	Slovakia	10

13th place
16	Italy	14
23	U.S. Virgin Islands	13
15th place
21	China	17
14	Slovakia	12

==== 17th–20th placement ====
17th–20th place
24	Poland	13
28	Chinese Taipei	6
15	Scotland	14
19	Austria	11

17th place
24	Poland	10
15	Scotland	8
19th place
28	Chinese Taipei	12
19	Austria	17

==== 21st–28th placement ====
21st–28th place
12	Hong Kong	20
20	Belgium	9
17	Puerto Rico	12
25	Greece	15
18	Jamaica	13
26	Hungary	6
22	Switzerland	15
27	Mexico	11

21st–24th place
12	Hong Kong	20
25	Greece	9
18	Jamaica	10
22	Switzerland	8

21st place
12	Hong Kong	16
18	Jamaica	15
23rd place
25	Greece	11
22	Switzerland	5

==== 25th–28th placement ====
25th–28th place
17	Puerto Rico	16
20	Belgium	13
18	Hungary	0
27	Mexico	1

25th place
17	Puerto Rico	20
27	Mexico	14
27th place
20	Belgium	1
18	Hungary	0

=== Final standings ===
Rank	Team	Pld	W	L	GF	GA	GD
1st place, gold medalist(s)	Canada	6	6	0			
2nd place, silver medalist(s)	United States	6	4	2			
3rd place, bronze medalist(s)	Haudenosaunee	6	3	3			
4	England	6	1	5			
5	Israel	7	6	1			
6	Czech Republic	7					
7	Ireland	7					
8	Japan	7					
9	Finland	7					
10	Germany	7					
11	Australia	7					
12	Netherlands	7					
13	Italy	8					
14	U.S. Virgin Islands	7					
15	China	7					
16	Slovakia	8					
17	Poland	7					
18	Scotland	7					
19	Austria	7					
20	Chinese Taipei	7					
21	Hong Kong	8					
22	Jamaica	7					
23	Greece	7					
24	Switzerland	7					
25	Puerto Rico	7					
26	Mexico	7					
27	Belgium	6	2	5	55	101	-46
28	Hungary	5	0	7	42	91	-49

=== All-World Team ===
- Goaltender: Christian Del Bianco, (Canada)
- Defense: Steve Priolo, (Canada)
- Transition: Connor Kirst, (United States)
- Forward: Jack Hannah, (United States)
- Forward: Randy Staats, (Haudenosaunee)
- Forward: Jeff Teat, (Canada)

== Women ==
=== Pool play ===
==== Pool A ====
Rank	Team	GP	W	L	GF	GA	DIF	PTS	Advanced to
1	United States	4	4	0	99	11	88	4	Quarter-finals
2	Haudenosaunee	4	3	1	55	24	31	3	Quarter-finals
3	England	4	2	2	34	62	-28	2	Quarter-finals
4	Netherlands	4	1	3	29	73	-44	1	Play-In
5	Hong Kong	4	0	4	25	72	-47	0	Play-In

==== Pool B ====
Rank	Team	GP	W	L	GF	GA	DIF	PTS	Advanced to
1	Canada	4	4	0	113	0	113	4	Quarter-finals
2	Australia	4	3	1	60	39	21	3	Quarter-finals
3	Germany	4	2	2	37	57	-20	2	Quarter-finals
4	Ireland	4	1	3	27	65	-38	1	Play-In
5	Finland	4	0	4	6	82	-76	0	Play-In

- Standings
- Tiebreaking

=== Championship Round ===
==== Championship Bracket ====
Play-In
B4	Ireland	12
A5	Hong Kong	7
A4	Netherlands	23
B5	Finland	3

Quarter-finals
A1	United States	30
B4	Ireland	1
B2	Australia	19
A3	England	12
B1	Canada	33
A4	Netherlands	2
A2	Haudenosaunee	7
B3	Germany	2

Semi-finals
A1	United States	26
B2	Australia	2
B1	Canada	19
A2	Haudenosaunee	3

Final
A1	United States	10
B1	Canada	7
Third place
B2	Australia	4
A2	Haudenosaunee	21

=== Placement Round ===
==== 5th–8th Placement ====
Round 1
A3	England	11
B4	Ireland	6
B3	Germany	12
A4	Netherlands	11

5th Place Game
A3	England	14
B3	Germany	13
7th Place Game
B4	Ireland	10
A4	Netherlands	11

==== 9th–10th Placement ====
9th Place Game
A5	Hong Kong	9
B5	Finland	3

=== Final standings ===
Rank	Team	Pld	W	L	GF	GA	GD
1st place, gold medalist(s)	United States						
2nd place, silver medalist(s)	Canada						
3rd place, bronze medalist(s)	Haudenosaunee						
4	Australia						
5	England						
6	Germany						
7	Netherlands						
8	Ireland	8	2	6			
9	Hong Kong						
10	Finland						

=== All-World Team ===
- Goaltender: Ingrid Boyum, (United States)
- Defense: Jordan Dean, (Canada)
- Transition: Ally Kennedy, (United States)
- Forward/Transition: Megan Kinna, (Canada)
- Forward: Erin Bakes, (United States)
- Forward: Erica Evans, (Canada)
