= Cory Bomberry =

Haudenosaunee lacrosse player

Personal information
- Nationality: Haudenosaunee
- Born: August 9, 1976 (age 50) Six Nations, Ontario
- Height: 5 ft 11 in (180 cm)
- Weight: 215 lb (98 kg; 15 st 5 lb)

Sport
- Position: Forward
- Shoots: Right
- NLL draft: 3rd overall, 1996; Rochester Knighthawks
- NLL team Former teams: Rochester Knighthawks; Buffalo Bandits; Arizona Sting
- MSL team: Six Nations Chiefs
- Pro career: 1997–2010

Cory Bomberry (born August 9, 1976) is a Haudenosaunee former lacrosse player. He played most recently for the Rochester Knighthawks of the National Lacrosse League. He spent his career as an attacker.

Bomberry can be considered a popular Haudenosaunee lacrosse player. Although he spent most of his NLL career in Rochester, he is also well known for his tenure in Buffalo. What's more, his goal on Feb. 18, 2006 against Minnesota, assisted by Bandits star John Tavares, helped Tavares to tie Gary Gait's then-existing NLL Career Points Record.

== NLL career ==
He was selected as a first-round pick of the Knighthawks in 1997. He entered the league as two-time winner of Mann Cup with the Six Nations Chiefs in 1995 and 1996. He played there from 1997 to 2003 and won the 1997 championship. He then left the team and spent one year in Arizona Sting and three years in Buffalo Bandits. In Buffalo, he also took part in the 2008 NLL Championship, which was his seventh trip to the finals. In 2009, it was reported, that Bomberry was returning to Knighthawks, but he was released after the season.

During his 13-year pro career, he has twice been recognized by the Turtle Island News, leading native weekly newspaper in North America, as the winner of the National Lacrosse League Native American MVP Award.

== International career ==
Bomberry also took part in number of major international events, including three World Indoor Lacrosse Championship in 2003, and 2007, and 2011. The Iroquois Nationals won silver medals in all three tournaments.

== Statistics ==
		Regular Season						Playoffs
Season	Team	GP	G	A	Pts	LB	PIM	GP	G	A	Pts	LB	PIM
1997	Rochester	1	0	2	2	2	2	--	--	--	--	--	--
1998	Rochester	12	19	31	50	56	26	1	3	2	5	10	2
1999	Rochester	12	11	21	32	62	14	2	2	2	4	14	2
2000	Rochester	12	17	25	42	71	14	2	2	4	6	9	6
2001	Rochester	14	24	42	66	69	14	1	0	2	2	6	0
2002	Rochester	16	22	44	66	104	12	2	3	2	5	6	0
2003	Rochester	16	22	43	65	72	4	2	1	6	7	6	0
2004	Arizona	16	23	43	66	46	10	--	--	--	--	--	--
2005	Arizona	15	24	23	47	0	0	3	3	8	11	0	0
2006	Buffalo	15	21	27	48	89	0	3	3	9	12	17	0
2007	Buffalo	15	16	33	49	46	0	2	2	3	5	10	0
2008	Buffalo	16	17	38	55	59	0	3	1	3	4	8	0
2009	Buffalo	15	15	36	51	46	0	2	1	4	5	2	0
2010	Rochester	8	4	11	15	32	2	--	--	--	--	--	--
	NLL totals	183	235	419	654	754	105	23	21	45	66	79	10
