= Kevin Huntley (lacrosse) =

American lacrosse player

Personal information
- Nationality: American
- Born: September 20, 1986 (age 39) Towson, Maryland, U.S.
- Height: 5 ft 10 in (178 cm)
- Weight: 190 lb (86 kg; 13 st 8 lb)

Sport
- Position: Attack
- Shoots: Left
- NLL draft: 5th overall, 2008; San Jose Stealth
- NLL team: Philadelphia Wings
- MLL team Former teams: Long Island Lizards; Los Angeles Riptide; Washington Bayhawks; Toronto Nationals
- NCAA team: Johns Hopkins University
- Pro career: 2008–

Kevin Huntley (born September 20, 1986) is a professional lacrosse player with the Toronto Nationals of Major League Lacrosse and the Philadelphia Wings of the National Lacrosse League. He plays the attack position. Huntley played collegiate lacrosse at Johns Hopkins University where he helped his team win two national championships, and finished his college career as the eighth all-time leading goal scorer in Johns Hopkins history. His father, Dave Huntley, was also an All-American at Johns Hopkins. In 2008, Huntley was named Major League Lacrosse Rookie of the Year.

== Collegiate career ==
Huntley won two national championships while playing with the Johns Hopkins Blue Jays. As a freshman, he played in fifteen games and helped the Blue Jays win the 2005 NCAA Division I Men's Lacrosse Championship. He led his team in goals during the tournament. In 2006, as a sophomore, Huntley was awarded USILA third team All-American honors. In his junior season he helped his team win the 2007 NCAA Division I Men's Lacrosse Championship. In the Blue Jays' quarterfinal game against Georgetown University, Huntley scored a career high five goals. Earlier in the contest, Huntley was penalized for using an illegal stick. When he returned to play he was using a teammate's stick when he scored all five goals. As a senior, Huntley and the Blue Jays were again in the national championship game; however, this time they were defeated by the Syracuse Orange.

Before playing at Hopkins, Huntley was twice awarded the All-Metro High School Player of the Year by the Baltimore Sun while playing at Calvert Hall College High School. In addition, as a sixteen-year-old, he represented Team Canada at the 2003 Under-19 World Lacrosse Championships, helping his team win the silver medal.

Huntley and his father Dave Huntley, a former All-American midfielder at Johns Hopkins, are the only father–son duo to win two national championships, and are only the second pairing to score 100 or more goals each in their respective Division I lacrosse careers.

Season	GP	G	A	Pts	PPG
2005	15	23	6	29	1.93
2006	14	30	6	36	2.57
2007	17	22	9	31	1.82
2008	17	34	9	43	2.53
Totals	63	109	30	139	2.21

== Professional career ==
Huntley began his professional career with the Los Angeles Riptide in 2008. Originally drafted by the San Francisco Dragons 17th overall in the 2008 MLL Collegiate Draft, Huntley was immediately traded to the Riptide on draft day. Huntley joined a Riptide team that was coached by Huntley family friend John Tucker.

Huntley has had an immediate impact on the league, and was named Rookie of the Week three times, Offensive Player of the Week once. He also set a record for the most goals scored by a rookie in Major League Lacrosse, breaking Adam Doneger's mark set in 2003. Following the season, Huntley was presented the Major League Lacrosse Rookie of the Year Award.

On February 12, 2010 it was announced Huntley was traded to the Hamilton Nationals along with four other players.

== Statistics ==
=== Major League Lacrosse ===
		Regular Season							Playoffs
Season	Team	GP	G	2ptG	A	Pts	LB	PIM	GP	G	2ptG	A	Pts	LB	PIM
2008	Los Angeles	9	30	0	5	35	17	1	1	3	1	0	4	0
2009	Washington	12	23	2	6	31	5	1.5	--	--	--	--	--	--	--
MLL Totals		21	53	2	11	66	22	2.5	1	3	1	0	4	3	0

== Awards ==
Preceded by Alex Smith	MLL Rookie of the Year; 2008	Succeeded by Incumbent
