= Australia national lacrosse team =

Australia national lacrosse team may refer to:

== Men's teams ==
- Australia men's national lacrosse team
- Australia national indoor lacrosse team

== Women's teams ==
- Australia women's national lacrosse team
