= Andrew Irving =

Andrew or Andy Irving may refer to:

- Andrew Scott Irving (1837–1904), Scottish-born Canadian bookseller and publisher
- Andy Irving (born 2000), Scottish footballer
- Andrew Irving (architect), Australian architect
- Andrew Irving (curler) (fl. 2009–2018), curling player (2009 Safeway Championship)
- Andrew Irving (lacrosse) (fl. 2011), lacrosse player (2011 Denver Outlaws season)
