= 2009 Denver Outlaws season =

2009 Denver Outlaws
- League: Major League Lacrosse
- 2009 record: 9-3
- Home record: 4-2
- Road record: 5-1
- General Manager: Brian Reese
- Coach: Brian Reese
- Arena: Invesco Field at Mile High

The 2009 Denver Outlaws season was the fourth season for the Outlaws in Major League Lacrosse. Coming off of their second championship loss and an 8–4 record in the previous year, the Outlaws were looking to avenge themselves. They would end up finishing with a 9–3 record and clinch a playoff spot for the fourth consecutive time. However, they would end up losing in the championship game for the third time to the Toronto Nationals by a 10–9 score.

== Offseason ==
The Outlaws acquired Max Seibald, the 2nd overall pick out of Cornell, 7th overall pick Shane Walterhoefer out of North Carolina, and 8th overall pick Dan Hardy from Syracuse in the 2009 Major League Lacrosse Collegiate Draft

== Regular season ==
=== Schedule ===
Date	Opponent	Stadium	Result	Record
May 16	Chicago Machine	Invesco Field at Mile High	L 11-13	0-1
May 22	at Boston Cannons	Harvard Stadium	W 15-14	1-1
May 30	Washington Bayhawks	Invesco Field at Mile High	W 20-16	2-1
June 7	at Chicago Machine	Toyota Park	W 15-11	3-1
June 13	Long Island Lizards	Invesco Field at Mile High	W 16-9	4-1
June 20	Toronto Nationals	Invesco Field at Mile High	W 15-8	5-1
June 27	at Toronto Nationals	BMO Field	W 20-16	6-1
July 4	Boston Cannons	Invesco Field at Mile High	L 16-17	6-2
July 18	at Washington Bayhawks	Navy–Marine Corps Memorial Stadium	W 11-8	7-2
July 25	Long Island Lizards	Invesco Field at Mile High	W 12-7	8-2
August 1	at Long Island Lizards	James M. Shuart Stadium	W 13-9	9-2
August 8	at Toronto Nationals	BMO Field	L 10-16	9-3

=== Postseason ===
Date	Round	Opponent	Stadium	Result
August 22	Semifinal	Boston Cannons	Navy–Marine Corps Memorial Stadium	W 11-10
August 23	Steinfeld Cup	Toronto Nationals	Navy–Marine Corps Memorial Stadium	L 9-10

== Standings ==
Team	W	L	PCT	GB	GF	2ptGF	GA	2ptGA
Denver Outlaws	9	3	.750	–	166	8	138	6
Toronto Nationals	7	5	.583	2	184	4	172	9
Long Island Lizards	6	6	.500	3	125	4	144	9
Boston Cannons	6	6	.500	3	173	12	150	6
Washington Bayhawks	5	7	.417	4	148	14	175	9
Chicago Machine	3	9	.250	6	159	8	176	11

Qualified for playoffs
