= Dean Hill =

Haudenosaunee lacrosse player

Personal information
- Nationality: Haudenosaunee
- Born: October 26, 1986 Scarborough, Ontario, Canada
- Died: September 5, 2021 (aged 34)
- Height: 6 ft 3 in (191 cm)
- Weight: 225 lb (102 kg; 16 st 1 lb)

Sport
- Position: Forward
- Shoots: Left
- NLL draft: 48th overall, 2005; Minnesota Swarm
- NLL teams: Colorado Mammoth; Washington Stealth; Edmonton Rush; Rochester Knighthawks; Minnesota Swarm; Georgia Swarm
- WLA team: Victoria Shamrocks
- Pro career: 2006–

Dean Hill (October 26, 1986 – September 5, 2021) was a Haudenosaunee professional box lacrosse player.

== Professional career ==
Hill was selected in 2005 NLL Entry Draft by Minnesota Swarm. He came to Minnesota after a season in OJBLL on the team St. Catharines Spartans. Hill scored 80 points in 20 games and led the team in scoring. He also ranked 5th in the league in goals and 7th in scoring. In his second season in the league, he posted 32 goals and 53 points. Troubles with playing time led to his trade to the Rochester Knighthawks.

In 2009, he was traded again, this time to the Edmonton Rush.

== International career ==
Dean Hill also took part in number of major international events as a member of Iroquois Nationals, including two World Indoor Lacrosse Championship in 2007 and 2011, where he and his team gained silver medals.

== Statistics ==
| | | Regular Season | | | | | | Playoffs |
| Season | Team | GP | G | A | Pts | LB | PIM | GP | G | A | Pts | LB | PIM |
|---|---|---|---|---|---|---|---|---|---|---|---|---|---|
| 2006 | Minnesota | 2 | 6 | 1 | 7 | 5 | 0 | -- | -- | -- | -- | -- | -- |
| 2007 | Minnesota | 14 | 32 | 21 | 53 | 29 | 0 | 1 | 1 | 1 | 2 | 5 | 0 |
| 2008 | Minnesota | 7 | 9 | 10 | 19 | 9 | 0 | -- | -- | -- | -- | -- | -- |
| 2009 | Minnesota | 4 | 2 | 9 | 11 | 16 | 0 | -- | -- | -- | -- | -- | -- |
| 2009 | Rochester | 3 | 2 | 3 | 5 | 11 | 0 | -- | -- | -- | -- | -- | -- |
| 2010 | Edmonton | 11 | 18 | 11 | 29 | 34 | 0 | 2 | 5 | 2 | 7 | 4 | 0 |
| 2011 | Edmonton | 13 | 10 | 12 | 22 | 32 | 2 | -- | -- | -- | -- | -- | -- |
| 2012 | Washington | 13 | 17 | 21 | 38 | 37 | 4 | -- | -- | -- | -- | -- | -- |
| 2013 | Washington | 16 | 20 | 18 | 38 | 29 | 4 | 3 | 1 | 2 | 3 | 6 | 0 |
| 2014 | Colorado | 2 | 1 | 2 | 3 | 2 | 7 | -- | -- | -- | -- | -- | -- |
| 2015 | Minnesota | 13 | 11 | 11 | 22 | 27 | 2 | -- | -- | -- | -- | -- | -- |
| | NLL totals | 98 | 128 | 119 | 247 | 231 | 25 | 6 | 7 | 5 | 12 | 15 | 0 |
