= 2010 Major League Lacrosse season =

2010 MLL season
- League: Major League Lacrosse
- Sport: Field lacrosse
- Duration: May 2010 – August 2010
- Teams: 6
- Finals champions: Chesapeake Bayhawks
- Runners-up: Long Island Lizards
- Finals MVP: Kyle Hartzell

MLL seasons
- ← 2009 season 2011 season →

The 2010 Major League Lacrosse season was the tenth season of the league. The season began on May 15, 2010 and concluded with the championship game on August 22, 2010.

== Milestones & events ==
=== Team movement ===
Chicago played as a "traveling team" in 2010 with "home games" in Cary, NC (WakeMed Soccer Park), Pittsburgh, PA (Joe Walton Stadium), Albany, NY (John Fallon Field), Virginia Beach, VA (Virginia Beach Sportsplex), Rochester, NY (Marina Auto Stadium) and Columbus, OH (Columbus Crew Stadium).

Washington renamed itself Chesapeake Bayhawks.

Toronto moved its home field from BMO Field to Lamport Stadium.

== Standings ==
W = Wins, L = Losses, PCT = Winning Percentage, GB = Games Back of first place, GF = Goals For, 2ptGF = 2 point Goals For, GA = Goals Against, 2ptGA = 2 point Goals Against

Final

Qualified for playoffs

Team	W	L	PCT	GB	GF	2ptGF	GA	2ptGA
Boston Cannons	8	4	.667	-	174	15	141	10
Denver Outlaws	8	4	.667	-	158	9	148	10
Long Island Lizards	7	5	.583	1	141	9	139	12
Chesapeake Bayhawks	6	6	.500	2	161	18	158	8
Chicago Machine	4	8	.333	4	157	4	171	11
Toronto Nationals	3	9	.250	5	132	8	166	12

Boston defeated Denver during the regular season 3-0 in games played.

== All Star Game ==
The 2010 game took place July 8 at Harvard Stadium in Boston. It featured the MLL All Stars playing Team USA. Team USA won 13-12. Brendan Mundorf (Denver) playing for Team USA was the game's MVP.

== Playoffs ==
The 2010 New Balance MLL Championship Weekend took place on Saturday and Sunday, August 21 and 22 at Navy–Marine Corps Memorial Stadium in Annapolis, Maryland.

Kyle Hartzell of Chesapeake was named MVP for the playoffs

Semifinals
1	Boston Cannons	9
4	Chesapeake Bayhawks	13
2	Denver Outlaws	12
3	Long Island Lizards	16

Steinfeld Cup Final
4	Chesapeake Bayhawks	13
3	Long Island Lizards	9

== Annual awards ==
Award	Winner	Team
MVP Award	Matt Poskay	Boston
Rookie of the Year Award	Ned Crotty	Chicago
Coach of the Year Award	Jim Mule	Long Island
Defensive player of the Year Award	Brodie Merrill	Toronto
Offensive player of the Year Award	Matt Poskay	Boston
Goaltender of the Year Award	Kip Turner	Boston
Sportsman of the Year Award	Tim Goettelmann	Long Island
Most Improved Player of the Year Award	Peet Poillon	Chesapeake
