= 2007 Denver Outlaws season =

2007 Denver Outlaws
- League: Major League Lacrosse
- 2007 record: 7-5
- Home record: 5-1
- Road record: 2-4
- General Manager: Brian Reese
- Coach: Jim Beardsmore, Brian Reese
- Stadium: Invesco Field at Mile High

The 2007 Denver Outlaws season was the second season for the Outlaws in Major League Lacrosse. Coming off of their first season in the league and losing in the championship, the Outlaws would finish with a 7–5 record and return to the playoffs for the second consecutive year. However, the Outlaws were unable to avenge themselves from the previous year's championship game and lost to the Philadelphia Barrage in the semifinal by the score of 13–12 in overtime.

== Offseason ==
The Outlaws acquired Drew Westervelt, the 4th overall pick from UMBC in the 2007 Major League Lacrosse Collegiate Draft. They have also hired Jim Beardsmore, who replaced Jarred Testa as new head coach

== Regular season ==
=== Schedule ===
Date	Opponent	Stadium	Result	Record
May 19	San Francisco Dragons	Invesco Field at Mile High	W 21-14	1-0
June 2	at Chicago Machine	Toyota Park	L 17-19	1-1
June 9	Los Angeles Riptide	Invesco Field at Mile High	W 18-15	2-1
June 16	Rochester Rattlers	Invesco Field at Mile High	L 26-27 (OT)	2-2
June 23	at San Francisco Dragons	Kezar Stadium	L 14-20	2-3
June 30	at Chicago Machine	Toyota Park	W 19-9	3-3
July 4	Chicago Machine	Invesco Field at Mile High	W 22-14	4-3
July 14	at Los Angeles Riptide	Home Depot Center	L 5-17	4-4
July 21	Philadelphia Barrage	Invesco Field at Mile High	W 15-13	5-4
July 28	at Long Island Lizards	Mitchel Athletic Complex	W 14-12	6-4
August 4	Los Angeles Riptide	Invesco Field at Mile High	W 11-10	7-4
August 11	at San Francisco Dragons	Kezar Stadium	L 15-16	7-5

=== Postseason ===
Date	Round	Opponent	Stadium	Result
August 25	Semifinal	Philadelphia Barrage	PAETEC Park	L 12-13 (OT)

== Standings ==
Western Conference
Team	W	L	PCT	GF	2ptGF	GA	2ptGA
Los Angeles Riptide	9	3	.750	190	5	138	5
Denver Outlaws	7	5	.583	190	7	174	12
San Francisco Dragons	4	8	.333	157	12	180	6
Chicago Machine	3	9	.250	162	7	218	6

Qualified for playoffs
