= 2011 Major League Lacrosse season =

2011 MLL season
- League: Major League Lacrosse
- Sport: Field lacrosse
- Duration: May 2011 – August 2011
- Teams: 6
- Season MVP: Paul Rabil
- Finals champions: Boston Cannons
- Runners-up: Hamilton Nationals
- Finals MVP: Jordan Burke

MLL seasons
- ← 2010 season 2012 season →

The 2011 Major League Lacrosse season was the 11th season of the league. The season began on May 14, 2011, and concluded with the championship game on August 28, 2011.

== Milestones & events ==
=== Team movement ===
The Chicago Machine moved to Rochester, NY and reestablished the Rochester Rattlers franchise. Hamilton, ON became the new home of the Nationals, and the team reflected it with a name change to the Hamilton Nationals.

On December 9, 2010, Commissioner David Gross, announced that in February 2011, there would be two expansion teams created for the 2012 MLL Season. Also, there would be two more expansion teams for 2013. The long-term goal is to have 16 teams by 2019. There were nineteen sites identified as potential markets including Chicago, Philadelphia, and San Francisco.

Later on January 21, 2011, Commissioner David Gross announced that Charlotte, North Carolina and Columbus, Ohio, had been approved as expansion teams for the 2012 season. Gross also announced that with the adding of two more teams, (to bring the total to eight) the league will return to a fourteen-game season in 2012.

== Standings ==
W = Wins, L = Losses, PCT = Winning Percentage, GB = Games Back of first place, GF = Goals For, 2ptGF = 2 point Goals For, GA = Goals Against, 2ptGA = 2 point Goals Against

Final

Playoff Seed

Team	W	L	PCT	GB	GF	2ptGF	GA	2ptGA
Boston Cannons	9	3	.750	-	164	9	133	9
Denver Outlaws	7	5	.583	2	150	6	123	12
Hamilton Nationals	7	5	.583	2	151	4	142	8
Chesapeake Bayhawks	6	6	.500	3	129	10	160	2
Long Island Lizards	5	7	.417	4	124	14	140	11
Rochester Rattlers	2	10	.167	7	134	9	154	10

Denver defeated Hamilton twice during the regular season.

== All Star Game ==
Team Warrior 21-20 Team Authority on July 9, 2011, at Harvard Stadium. Michael Kimmel (Team Warrior) was named MVP of the game.

== Playoffs ==
The 2011 New Balance MLL Championship Weekend took place on Saturday and Sunday, August 27 and 28 at Navy–Marine Corps Memorial Stadium in Annapolis, Maryland during Hurricane Irene. Jordan Burke of Boston was the MVP of the MLL Championship.

Semifinals
1	Boston	14
4	Chesapeake	13
2	Denver	9
3	Hamilton	11

Steinfeld Cup Final
1	Boston	10
3	Hamilton	9

== Annual awards ==
Award	Winner	Team
MVP Award	Paul Rabil	Boston
Rookie of the Year Award	Jeremy Boltus	Hamilton
Coach of the Year Award	Bill Daye	Boston
Defensive player of the Year Award	Brodie Merrill	Hamilton
Offensive player of the Year Award	Paul Rabil	Boston
Goaltender of the Year Award	Drew Adams	Long Island
Sportsman of the Year Award	Greg Bice	Rochester
Most Improved Player of the Year Award	Stephen Peyser	Long Island
