= 2014 Major League Lacrosse season =

2014 MLL season
- League: Major League Lacrosse
- Sport: Field lacrosse
- Duration: April 26, 2014 – August 23, 2014
- Teams: 8

2014
- Season MVP: Casey Powell (Florida Launch)
- Top scorer: Marcus Holman (Ohio Machine)

Steinfeld Cup
- Champions: Denver Outlaws
- Runners-up: Rochester Rattlers
- Finals MVP: John Grant, Jr. (Denver)

MLL seasons
- ← 2013 season 2015 season →

The 2014 Major League Lacrosse season was the 14th season of the league. The season began on April 26, 2014 and concluded on August 23, 2014 with the Denver Outlaws beating the Rochester Rattlers to win the franchise's first Steinfeld Cup.

== Milestones and events ==
- January 10, 2014- The Collegiate Draft took place in Philadelphia, Pennsylvania (in conjunction with the 2014 US Lacrosse National Convention). Midfielder Tom Schreiber was the first overall selection by the Ohio Machine

=== Coaching changes ===
On November 21, 2013, Major League Lacrosse announced that Denver Outlaws assistant Stan Ross would head the newly formed Florida Launch.

== Standings ==
Playoff Seed

Major League Lacrosse
	W	L	PCT	GB	GF	2ptGF	GA	2ptGA
Rochester Rattlers	10	4	.714	–	188	5	161	4
Denver Outlaws	9	5	.643	1	188	8	176	6
New York Lizards	9	5	.643	1	177	6	166	7
Ohio Machine	8	6	.571	2	200	6	189	4
Boston Cannons	6	8	.429	4	187	2	185	7
Chesapeake Bayhawks	5	9	.357	5	160	6	173	6
Florida Launch	5	9	.357	5	172	2	193	6
Charlotte Hounds	4	10	.286	6	153	9	182	4

== All Star Game ==
Team USA defeated Team MLL 10–9 in the 2014 MLL All Star Game.

== Playoffs ==
For only the second time and first time since 2002 the MLL playoffs were held over two weeks instead of one weekend. the semifinals were held in Denver and Rochester and the championship game in Kennesaw, Georgia.

Semifinals; August 16
1	Rochester	15
4	Ohio	11
2	Denver	14
3	New York	13

Steinfeld Cup Final; August 23
1	Rochester	11
2	Denver	12

== Annual awards ==
Award	Winner	Team
MVP Award	Casey Powell	Florida Launch
Rookie of the Year Award	Kieran McArdle	Florida Launch
Coach of the Year Award	Tim Soudan	Rochester Rattlers
Defensive player of the Year Award	Michael Manley	Rochester Rattlers
Offensive player of the Year Award	Casey Powell	Florida Launch
Goaltender of the Year Award	John Galloway	Rochester Rattlers
Most Improved Player of the Year Award	Justin Turri	Rochester Rattlers

=== All-Pro team ===
- Defensive Team:
  - G John Galloway, Rochester Rattlers
  - D Tucker Durkin, Florida Launch
  - D Michael Manley, Rochester Rattlers
  - D Joel White, Rochester Rattlers
  - D Lee Zink, Denver Outlaws
- Offensive Team:
  - M Peter Baum, Boston Cannons
  - M Greg Gurenlian, New York Lizards
  - M Paul Rabil, Boston Cannons
  - M Jeremy Sieverts, Denver Outlaws
  - A John Grant Jr., Denver Outlaws
  - A Rob Pannell, New York Lizards
  - A Casey Powell, Florida Launch
