= 2006 Denver Outlaws season =

2006 Denver Outlaws
- League: Major League Lacrosse
- 2006 record: 10-2
- Home record: 4-2
- Road record: 6-0
- General Manager: Brian Reese
- Coach: Jarred Testa
- Stadium: Invesco Field at Mile High

The 2006 Denver Outlaws season was the inaugural season for the Denver Outlaws of Major League Lacrosse. Coming in as a 2006 expansion team, the Outlaws began their first season on May 20, 2006 with a 24–14 win at home against the Chicago Machine. They finished the regular season with a 10–2 record, remaining undefeated on the road and clinching the Western Conference against the San Francisco Dragons in the semifinal by the score of 23–14, but would lose in the championship game against the Philadelphia Barrage by the score of 23–12.

== Regular season ==
=== Schedule ===
Date	Opponent	Stadium	Result	Record
May 20	Chicago Machine	Invesco Field at Mile High	W 24-14	1-0
May 28	at San Francisco Dragons	Kezar Stadium	W 15-11	2-0
June 3	Baltimore Bayhawks	Invesco Field at Mile High	W 24-14	3-0
June 10	San Francisco Dragons	Invesco Field at Mile High	L 20-25	3-1
June 17	at New Jersey Pride	Yurcak Field	W 19-15	4-1
June 24	San Francisco Dragons	Invesco Field at Mile High	L 19-20	4-2
July 1	Los Angeles Riptide	Invesco Field at Mile High	W 22-11	5-2
July 8	at Los Angeles Riptide	Home Depot Center	W 17-7	6-2
July 22	Chicago Machine	Invesco Field at Mile High	W	7-2
July 29	at Long Island Lizards	Mitchel Athletic Complex	W	8-2
August 5	at Chicago Machine	Village of Lisle-Benedictine University Sports Complex	W	9-2
August 12	at Los Angeles Riptide	Home Depot Center	W	10-2

=== Postseason ===
Date	Round	Opponent	Stadium	Result
August 25	Semifinal	San Francisco Dragons	Home Depot Center	W 23-14
August 27	Steinfeld Cup	Philadelphia Barrage	Home Depot Center	L 12-23

== Standings ==
Western Conference
Team	W	L	PTS	PCT	GF	2ptGF	GA	2ptGA
Denver Outlaws	10	2	20	.833	197	22	148	14
San Francisco Dragons	7	5	14	.583	179	13	170	12
Los Angeles Riptide	6	6	12	.500	148	8	150	10
Chicago Machine	0	12	0	.000	126	8	196	16

Qualified for playoffs
