= 2014 Florida Launch season =

2014 Florida Launch
- League: Major League Lacrosse
- Coach: Stan Ross
- Arena: Florida Atlantic University Stadium

The 2014 Florida Launch season is the inaugural season for the Launch in Major League Lacrosse in the United States of America. The Launch will be created from the 23-Man Protected Roster of the now defunct Hamilton Nationals.

== Regular season ==
=== Schedule ===
Date	Opponent	Stadium	Result	Score	Attendance	Record
April 26	Denver Outlaws	Florida Atlantic University Stadium	L	10-14		0-1
May 3	Charlotte Hounds	Florida Atlantic University Stadium	W	11-8		1-1
May 10	Ohio Machine	Florida Atlantic University Stadium	W	10-9		2-1
May 17	at Chesapeake Bayhawks	Navy–Marine Corps Memorial Stadium	W	12-15		3-1
June 1	at Rochester Rattlers	Sahlen's Stadium	L	18-11		3-2
June 7	New York Lizards	Florida Atlantic University Stadium	W	11-8		4-2
June 14	at Charlotte Hounds	American Legion Memorial Stadium	L	14-13		4-3
June 20	Rochester Rattlers	Florida Atlantic University Stadium	L	13-18		4-4
June 28	Chesapeake Bayhawks	Florida Atlantic University Stadium	L	11-18		4-5
July 3	at New York Lizards	James M. Shuart Stadium	L	20-11		4-6
July 20	at Denver Outlaws	Sports Authority Field at Mile High	L	13-10		4-7
July 26	Boston Cannons	Florida Atlantic University Stadium	W	23-17		5-7
August 2	at Boston Cannons	Harvard Stadium	L	16-15		5-8
August 19	at Ohio Machine	Selby Field	L	14-10		5-9

== Standings ==
Playoff Seed

Major League Lacrosse
	W	L	PCT	GB	GF	2ptGF	GA	2ptGA
Rochester Rattlers	10	4	.714	–	188	5	161	4
Denver Outlaws	9	5	.643	1	188	8	176	6
New York Lizards	9	5	.643	1	177	6	166	7
Ohio Machine	8	6	.571	2	200	6	189	4
Boston Cannons	6	8	.429	4	187	2	185	7
Chesapeake Bayhawks	5	9	.357	5	160	6	173	6
Florida Launch	5	9	.357	5	172	2	193	6
Charlotte Hounds	4	10	.286	6	153	9	182	4
