= Ian Dingman =

American lacrosse player

Personal information
- Nationality: American
- Born: December 5, 1982 (age 43) Deferiet, New York, U.S.
- Height: 6 ft 4 in (193 cm)
- Weight: 260 lb (120 kg; 18 st 8 lb)

Sport
- Position: Midfield
- Shoots: Right
- NCAA team: United States Naval Academy (2007)
- MLL draft: 30th overall, 2007; Philadelphia Barrage
- MLL teams: Philadelphia Barrage; Ohio Machine
- Pro career: 2007–2016

Ian Dingman (born December 5, 1982) is a graduate of the United States Naval Academy and a lacrosse player.

Dingman, from Deferiet, New York, attended Carthage Senior High School where he lettered in lacrosse four times, football twice, and basketball once. Dingman also attended Bridgton Academy in North Bridgton, Maine.

== Collegiate career ==
In Dingman's freshman year at Navy in 2003, he came off the bench in 11 of 13 games to lead the Midshipmen in scoring with 23 goals and 17 assists. He also had 20 groundballs on the year and garnered Second-Team All-ECAC honors and was named ECAC rookie of the week twice. He received the William H. "Dinty" Moore Award as Navy's top offensive player.

In Dingman's sophomore campaign in 2004, he garnered Second-Team All-American honors after scoring 36 goals and dishing out 26 assists. He was also named First-Team All-Patriot League and was the recipient of the William H. "Dinty" Moore Award as Navy's top offensive player for the second year in a row. Against top 5 teams in the country, Dingman scored 9 goals and dished out 4 assists. Navy advanced to the NCAA championship game, where they lost to Syracuse 14-13.

In 2005, Dingman's career took a turn as he was academically ineligible and disenrolled from the Naval Academy. He attended Jefferson Community College in New York but did not play lacrosse. He was readmitted to the Naval Academy on the first day of classes in August 2005.

After a year away from lacrosse, Dingman returned to the playing field and in 2006 and received the William H. "Dinty" Moore Award for the third time in his career as Navy's best offensive player. He had a team-high 33 goals and also had 11 assists. He also scooped up 31 ground balls during the season.

In Ian Dingman's final year of collegiate lacrosse in 2007, he scored 33 goals and had 9 assists to go along with 29 ground balls. Dingman finished his career as Navy's second all-time leading goal scorer with 125 goals and finished fourth all-time in points scored at Navy with 188 points (125 goals, 63 assists).

== MLL career ==
Dingman was drafted in the third round of the 2007 MLL Collegiate Draft by the Philadelphia Barrage of the Major League Lacrosse.

On July 17, 2007, Dingman was awarded the Cascade MLL Rookie of the Week Award for his efforts in his professional lacrosse debut.

== Statistics ==
=== Navy ===
Season	GP	G	A	Pts
2003	13	23	17	40
2004	18	36	26	62
2006	15	33	11	44
2007	15	33	9	42
Totals	61	125	63	188
