= John Grant Jr. =

Canadian lacrosse player & coach (born 1974)

Personal information
- Nickname: Junior
- Born: November 7, 1974 (age 52) Peterborough, Ontario, Canada
- Height: 6 ft 2 in (188 cm)
- Weight: 220 lb (100 kg; 15 st 10 lb)

Sport
- Position: Forward / Attack
- Shoots: Left
- NCAA team: Delaware (1999)
- NLL draft: 1st overall, 1999; Rochester Knighthawks
- NLL teams: Rochester Knighthawks; Colorado Mammoth
- MLL teams: Rochester Rattlers; Hamilton Nationals; New York Lizards; Chesapeake Bayhawks; Denver Outlaws; Ohio Machine
- CLA teams: Peterborough Lakers; Coquitlam Adanacs
- Pro career: 2000–2017, 2019-2020

Career highlights
- Lt. Raymond Enners Award (1999); MSL MVP (2000); Mike Kelley Memorial Trophy (2004, 2007); MLL MVP (2007, 2008); NLL MVP (2007, 2012); NJCAA Lacrosse Hall Of Fame (2010)
- U.S. Lacrosse Hall of Fame, 2024; NLL Hall of Fame, 2021; Professional Lacrosse Hall of Fame, 2022
Medal record
Representing Canada
Box lacrosse
Heritage Cup
Second place	2002 Canada
First place	2004 United States
World Indoor Lacrosse Championship
Gold medal – first place	2003 Canada
Gold medal – first place	2007 Canada
Gold medal – first place	2011 Czech Republic
Field lacrosse
World Lacrosse Championship
Silver medal – second place	1998 United States
Silver medal – second place	2002 Australia
Gold medal – first place	2006 Canada
Silver medal – second place	2010 England

John Christopher Grant Jr. (born November 7, 1974) is a Canadian-American professional lacrosse coach and retired professional lacrosse player who has played in Major League Lacrosse, the National Lacrosse League, and the Ontario Lacrosse Association. He currently serves as head coach of Lees–McRae College.

He is widely regarded as one of the greatest lacrosse players of all time.

== Personal ==
Grant is the son of John Grant Sr., a former star in the Ontario Lacrosse Association and the original Philadelphia Wings. Grant Jr., known as Junior, has a physical education degree from the University of Delaware. He is married to Raygen Rogers and has one daughter.

== OLA career ==
Grant began his Ontario Lacrosse Association career with the Peterborough Lakers in the OLA Junior A Lacrosse League. He was named the OLA Junior A Lacrosse League Most Valuable Player in 1994, and was the league's top scorer in 1993, 1994, and 1995. In 1995, Grant moved up to the Major Series Lacrosse (MSL) with the Peterborough Lakers, where he won the Top Rookie of the Year award. In 2000, Grant won the MSL Most Valuable Player award. In 2002 and 2003, Grant moved west, playing in the Western Lacrosse Association with the Coquitlam Adanacs, earning All-Star recognition.

Grant came back to the Peterborough Lakers in 2004 and led the team to a Mann Cup victory, earning the Mike Kelley Memorial Trophy as the competition's Most Valuable Player. In 2006 and 2007, Grant again won the Mann Cup as a member of the Lakers, earning his second Mann Cup MVP in 2007.

Grant suited up for the Peterborough Lakers of Major Series Lacrosse on July 9, 2009, a surprisingly early comeback from his surgery. In 2010, Grant and the Peterborough Lakers won the Mann Cup once again, beating out the New Westminster Salmonbellies.

== College career ==
Grant was drafted by the Buffalo Bandits in 1995, but he didn't sign, instead opting to attend junior college at SUNY Morrisville playing for future Yale coach Andy Shay. Grant transferred to the University of Delaware and played the 1998 and 1999 seasons, again teaming up with Shay who had moved there as an assistant, with the Fightin' Blue Hens compiling a 23 and 8 during that time. Grant made the USILA All-American team his junior season, but really attracted national attention his senior year.

In 1999, Grant had 56 goals and 54 assists for 110 points, leading the nation in assists and points and setting school records for both categories. He was named the USILA National Collegiate Player of the Year and was awarded the Jack Turnbull Award as National Attackman of the Year. Grant was Delaware's first USILA First Team All-American. John led the school to its first ever NCAA quarterfinal appearance as well as its first 14-win season, with victories over perennial lacrosse powers North Carolina, Navy and Towson, in addition to 4 other top 20 teams.

Grant's 110-point 1999 season is among the top single-seasons. He was the last Division I player to average more than 6 points-per-game for an entire season (1999), until Lyle Thompson did this in 2013.

In 2010, Grant was inducted into the NJCAA Lacrosse Hall of Fame.

== NLL career ==
Grant was originally drafted by the Buffalo Bandits in the third round of the 1995 MILL Entry Draft. He was never signed by the Bandits, opting instead to attend college, re-entered the draft four years later when he was drafted first overall by the Rochester Knighthawks in the 1999 NLL Entry Draft, and was named NLL Rookie of the Year for the 2000 season. He holds several franchise records including most goals (347) and most points (719). Grant is also tied for fifth all-time in goals, third in assists per game and 12th in points in NLL history. He has some of the team's single-season records too, including: Most goals (54), most assists (60), and most points (111). Grant is also the team's all-time leader in playoff goals (47) and points (82).

In 2007 Grant set a National Lacrosse League record with 15 points in a single game (9 goals, 6 assists) in a win over the New York Titans, since broken by Mark Steenhuis. He was recognized with Overall Player of the Week Honors for his record-breaking achievement. After the regular season, Grant was named the 2007 NLL MVP, and then on May 12, 2007, Grant capped off his extraordinary season by being named Champion's Cup game MVP, as the Knighthawks defeated the Arizona Sting 13–11 to win their second championship. On May 25, 2007, Rochester Mayor Robert Duffy awarded Grant the Key to the City in recognition of the Knighthawks' championship.

Grant missed the entire 2009 season after having emergency surgery to remove an infection in his knee. In 2010, Grant returned to form playing in 15 of his team's 16 games, though Rochester missed the playoffs.

On October 27, 2010, Grant (plus defender Mac Allen) was traded to the Colorado Mammoth in exchange for 2010 NLL Goaltender of the Year Matt Vinc, plus transition players Matt Zash and Brad Self. Draft picks were also exchanged in the trade, which the Knighthawks said they executed to alleviate the effects of an aging roster, despite being reluctant to deal Grant after such a long and successful tenure in Rochester.

After a strong debut season with the Mammoth in which he scored 83 points (matching his 2010 total), Grant had one of the best years of his career in 2012. He scored his 1000th career point in January and his 500th career goal in March, set a new NLL record with 116 points in a season, and was named MVP for the second time in his career.

== MLL career ==
He played for the Rochester Rattlers in their inaugural season in 2001, and finished second in the league with 59 points (41 goals, 3 two-pointers, 15 assists) in 14 games. He was also named an MLL All-Star and earned league Offensive Player of the Year honors. After not playing in the league from 2002 through 2004, he returned to the Rattlers for the 2005 season. In 2007, Grant broke the league's single-season points record with 71 points, was named Offensive Player of the Year for the second time, and was awarded the Major League Lacrosse MVP Award. In 2008, Grant led the league in scoring with 64 points (47 goals, 4 two-pointers, 13 assists) and was named the 2008 Bud Light Major League Lacrosse Most Valuable Player for the second year in a row. Grant and the Rattlers went on to win the MLL Championship in 2008, with a 16 to 6 defeat of Denver. This was the first MLL title for the Rattlers.

He, along with the rest of the Rattlers franchise and roster, transferred to the Toronto (later Hamilton) Nationals when the franchise was bought by a new ownership group in 2009.

On June 14, 2011, it was announced that Grant Jr was traded to the Long Island Lizards for a second-round draft pick in the 2012 Collegiate draft, which would become a 4th-round pick if Grant Jr does not report. Nationals general manager Jody Gage—the same GM who traded Grant away from the Knighthawks—cited a desire to go with a younger roster as a factor in the trade decision.

In February 2012, Grant Jr was traded to the Chesapeake Bayhawks.

Grant Jr. was traded to the Denver Outlaws, along with defenseman Michael Simon, in exchange for attackman Brendan Mundorf and the 16th pick in the 2014 collegiate draft in September 2013. He spent two-and-a-half seasons with the Outlaws before being traded to his sixth team, the Ohio Machine, in June 2016 following a 2–6 start to the Outlaws' season. In the Machine's final game of the regular season, Grant Jr. scored ten goals in a huge victory over the New York Lizards, clinching a playoff berth for the Machine and becoming the first MLL player to score 10 goals in a game. Grant Jr. helped the Machine get to their first championship game that summer, but faced his former team in the Denver Outlaws, who had rattled off seven straight victories. The Machine surrendered a huge lead and Grant Jr. lost his first championship game, 19–18 in a weather-delayed game. Grant Jr., at 42, announced his retirement from the league on April 19, 2017.

=== Return from retirement ===
John Grant Jr. announced on May 27, 2019, that he would return to the playing field for the Denver Outlaws. He had already spent the last two years as an assistant coach for the Outlaws, but would step into a player-coach role for the 2019 summer. At 44, Grant Jr. would become by far the oldest active player in Major League Lacrosse. He entered the season only needing five points to surpass Paul Rabil as the all-time leading scorer in MLL history. He hit this mark on June 9 in an 18–16 win over the Atlanta Blaze

On July 9, the league announced the 44-year-old John Grant Jr. had been selected to the MLL All Star Game. As of July 9, Grant Jr. was 11th in the league in points (18) with 10 goals and eight assists.

=== Professional Lacrosse Hall of Fame ===
On June 18, 2022, Grant was inducted into the Professional Lacrosse Hall of Fame as one of the eleven members of the inaugural class of inductees.

== Coaching career ==
Grant has served as player-coach for the Denver Outlaws of Major League Lacrosse. He was named men's lacrosse offensive coordinator at Johns Hopkins in 2020 and resigned in 2022 to "pursue other opportunities in the lacrosse world. He coached at the Maryland school, Gerstell Academy, for one year, in between Hopkins and the Redwoods Lacrosse Club. He was named an assistant coach for Redwoods Lacrosse Club on December 29, 2022.

On June 25, 2024, Grant was named the head coach of Division II Lees–McRae College.

== International lacrosse career ==
In 2006, Grant and Gary Gait led the Canadian national lacrosse team to an historic victory in the 2006 World Lacrosse Championship over the United States, 15–10. Grant led the tournament in points and assists and was selected for the All-World team. He has also represented Team Canada in the following events:

- 1998 World Lacrosse Championship, silver medal
- 2002 Heritage Cup, silver medal
- 2002 World Lacrosse Championship, silver medal
- 2003 World Indoor Lacrosse Championship, gold medal
- 2004 Heritage Cup, gold medal
- 2006 World Lacrosse Championship, gold medal
- 2007 World Indoor Lacrosse Championship, gold medal
- 2010 World Lacrosse Championships, silver medal
- 2011 World Indoor Lacrosse Championship, gold medal

== Accomplishments ==
- 1994 OLA Junior A Most Valuable Player
- 1995 MSL Rookie of the Year
- 1999 USILA National Collegiate Player of the Year
- 1999 National Collegiate Attackman of the Year
- 2000 NLL Rookie of the Year
- 2000 MSL Most Valuable Player
- 2001 MLL Offensive Player of the Year
- 2003 World Indoor Lacrosse Championship Champions (Canada)
- 2004 Heritage Cup Champions (Canada)
- 2004 Mann Cup Champions (Peterborough Lakers)
- 2004 Mann Cup Most Valuable Player
- 2006 World Lacrosse Championship Champions (Canada)
- 2006 World Lacrosse Championship- All World Team
- 2006 Mann Cup Champion (Peterborough Lakers)
- 2007 NLL Most Valuable Player
- 2007 NLL Champions Cup Champion (Rochester Knighthawks)
- 2007 NLL Champions Cup Most Valuable Player
- 2007 World Lacrosse Championships Champion (Canada)
- 2007 MLL Offensive Player of the Year
- 2007 MLL Most Valuable Player
- 2007 Mann Cup Champion (Peterborough Lakers)
- 2007 Mann Cup Most Valuable Player
- 2008 MLL Offensive Player of the Year
- 2008 MLL Most Valuable Player
- 2008 MLL Steinfeld Cup Champion (Rochester Rattlers)
- 2009 MLL Steinfeld Cup Champion (Toronto Nationals)
- 2010 Mann Cup Champion (Peterborough Lakers)
- 2010 World Lacrosse Championship- All World Team (Top Attackman)
- 2012 NLL Most Valuable Player
- 2012 MLL Steinfeld Cup Champion (Chesapeake Bayhawks)
- 2012 Mann Cup Champion (Peterborough Lakers)
- 2013 MLL Steinfeld Cup Champion (Chesapeake Bayhawks)
- 2014 MLL Steinfeld Cup Champion (Denver Outlaws)

== Statistics ==
=== NLL ===
John Grant Jr.		Regular season									Playoffs								
Season	Team	GP	G	A	Pts	LB	PIM	Pts/GP	LB/GP	PIM/GP	GP	G	A	Pts	LB	PIM	Pts/GP	LB/GP	PIM/GP
2000	Rochester Knighthawks	12	37	40	77	76	32	6.42	6.33	2.67	2	9	7	16	9	6	8.00	4.50	3.00
2001	Rochester Knighthawks	14	42	48	90	124	18	6.43	8.86	1.29	1	3	1	4	5	0	4.00	5.00	0.00
2002	Rochester Knighthawks	16	52	53	105	102	43	6.56	6.38	2.69	2	6	5	11	10	0	5.50	5.00	0.00
2003	Rochester Knighthawks	16	46	53	99	115	20	6.19	7.19	1.25	2	6	7	13	17	4	6.50	8.50	2.00
2004	Rochester Knighthawks	5	16	19	35	34	6	7.00	6.80	1.20	–	–	–	–	–	–	–	–	–
2005	Rochester Knighthawks	15	49	56	105	83	31	7.00	5.53	2.07	2	7	6	13	7	2	6.50	3.50	1.00
2006	Rochester Knighthawks	16	54	43	97	86	22	6.06	5.38	1.38	2	8	2	10	8	2	5.00	4.00	1.00
2007	Rochester Knighthawks	15	51	60	111	81	40	7.40	5.40	2.67	3	8	7	15	24	0	5.00	8.00	0.00
2008	Rochester Knighthawks	16	47	45	92	116	16	5.75	7.25	1.00	–	–	–	–	–	–	–	–	–
2010	Rochester Knighthawks	15	39	44	83	85	17	5.53	5.67	1.13	–	–	–	–	–	–	–	–	–
2011	Colorado Mammoth	16	36	47	83	45	12	5.19	2.81	0.75	1	3	1	4	3	0	4.00	3.00	0.00
2012	Colorado Mammoth	14	50	66	116	57	24	8.29	4.07	1.71	1	5	2	7	4	0	7.00	4.00	0.00
2013	Colorado Mammoth	16	43	48	91	42	22	5.69	2.63	1.38	1	2	3	5	1	0	5.00	1.00	0.00
2014	Colorado Mammoth	17	40	51	91	64	20	5.35	3.76	1.18	1	2	5	7	2	0	7.00	2.00	0.00
2015	Colorado Mammoth	18	34	57	91	42	10	5.06	2.33	0.56	1	1	2	3	5	2	3.00	5.00	2.00
2016	Colorado Mammoth	15	30	45	75	47	14	5.00	3.13	0.93	1	0	3	3	3	0	3.00	3.00	0.00
2017	Colorado Mammoth	2	2	3	5	3	2	2.50	1.50	1.00	–	–	–	–	–	–	–	–	–
		238	668	778	1,446	1,202	349	6.08	5.05	1.47	20	60	51	111	98	16	5.55	4.90	0.80
Career Total:		258	728	829	1,557	1,300	365	6.03	5.04	1.41									

GP–Games played; G–Goals; A–Assists; Pts–Points; LB–Loose balls; PIM–Penalty minutes; Pts/GP–Points per games played; LB/GP–Loose balls per games played; PIM/GP–Penalty minutes per games played.

=== Major League Lacrosse ===
		Regular Season							Playoffs
Season	Team	GP	G	2ptG	A	Pts	GB	PIM	GP	G	2ptG	A	Pts	GB	PIM
2001	Rochester	14	41	3	15	59	15	5.0	1	0	0	0	0	3	1.0
2005	Rochester	12	21	2	17	40	14	6.0	1	0	0	3	3	1	0.0
2006	Rochester	11	28	2	19	49	17	10.5	--	--	--	--	--	--	--
2007	Rochester	12	44	2	25	71	27	4.0	2	2	0	5	7	7	1.0
2008	Rochester	12	47	4	13	64	21	7.5	2	5	0	2	7	3	0.0
2009	Toronto	1	5	0	0	5	0	0.0	2	2	0	1	3	3	1.0
2010	Toronto	11	19	4	13	36	15	.5	--	--	--	--	--	--	--
2011	Hamilton / Long Island	10	12	0	10	22	9	5.0	--	--	--	--	--	--	--
2012	Chesapeake	10	20	1	11	32	12	0.0	2	4	0	2	6	2	0.0
2013	Chesapeake	11	20	0	12	32	13	3.0	2	6	0	1	7	2	0.0
2014	Denver	12	28	0	26	54	15	2.5	2	7	0	4	11	3	0.0
2015	Denver	10	24	0	18	42	15	3.0	--	--	--	--	--	--	--
2016	Ohio / Denver	8	13	0	10	23	6	1.5	2	8	0	4	12	1	0.0
MLL Totals		136	333	18	190	541	160	48.5	16	34	0	22	56	18	2.0

=== Canadian Lacrosse Association ===
			Regular Season					Playoffs
Season	Team	League	GP	G	A	Pts	PIM	GP	G	A	Pts	PIM
1991	Peterborough Lakers	OLA Jr A	18	12	15	27	22	0	0	0	0	0
1992	Peterborough Lakers	OLA Jr A	18	31	18	49	34	1	3	1	4	2
1993	Peterborough Lakers	OLA Jr A	20	78	46	124	51	6	17	12	29	6
1994	Peterborough Lakers	OLA Jr A	22	86	74	160	20	18	38	37	75	20
1994	Peterborough Lakers	MSL	2	4	3	7	0	0	0	0	0	0
1995	Peterborough Lakers	OLA Jr A	17	66	45	111	51	11	28	15	43	24
1995	Peterborough Lakers	MSL	3	4	8	12	4	0	0	0	0	0
1996	Peterborough Lakers	MSL	24	66	62	128	32	5	18	12	30	4
1997	Peterborough Lakers	MSL	16	29	36	65	16	0	0	0	0	0
1998	Peterborough Lakers	MSL	2	5	3	8	2	1	1	1	2	0
1999	Peterborough Lakers	MSL	10	18	21	39	24	11	18	17	35	14
2000	Peterborough Lakers	MSL	15	46	58	104	28	4	8	15	23	4
2002	Coquitlam Adanacs	WLA	13	30	39	69	16	10	26	25	51	14
2003	Coquitlam Adanacs	WLA	17	54	35	89	41	6	9	10	19	10
2004	Peterborough Lakers	MSL	4	3	5	8	0	18	35	40	75	31
2005	Peterborough Lakers	MSL	4	0	0	0	0	6	7	8	15	8
2006	Peterborough Lakers	MSL	5	9	11	20	0	17	37	40	77	22
2007	Peterborough Lakers	MSL	7	12	16	28	6	14	26	45	71	4
2008	Peterborough Lakers	MSL	11	34	30	64	4	8	13	15	28	10
2009	Peterborough Lakers	MSL	3	5	5	10	4	8	14	14	28	10
2010	Peterborough Lakers	MSL	6	15	15	30	4	18	34	43	77	12
2011	Peterborough Lakers	MSL	16	38	42	80	6	11	20	24	44	12
2012	Peterborough Lakers	MSL	8	24	13	37	12	15	37	32	69	6
Junior A Totals			95	273	198	471	127	36	86	65	153	52
Senior A Totals			166	396	402	798	199	152	303	341	644	161

=== University of Delaware ===
Season	Team	GP	G	A	Pts	PPG
1998	University of Delaware	15	40	27	67	4.46
1999	University of Delaware	17	56	54	110 ^{(a)}	6.47
NCAA Totals		32	96	81	177	5.53 ^{(b)}

^{(a)} 11th in NCAA Men's Division I Single Season Total Points
^{(b)} 15th in NCAA Men's Division I Career Points-per-Game

==== 1999 Season Game Log ====
Opponent	G	A	Pts	Opponent	G	A	Pts
Gannon	5	4	9	North Carolina #15	4	7	11
Harford	3	3	6	Penn State #9	4	1	5
Hofstra #17	4	1	5	Loyola #1	0	1	1
Butler #18	2	1	3	Drexel	3	2	5
Mt. St. Mary's	4	3	7	Vermont	2	7	9
Navy #10	4	4	8	Penn	4	0	4
Rutgers	5	5	10	UMBC #10	3	4	7
Towson #11	2	7	9	Virginia #2	4	3	7
Georgetown #8	3	1	4

== See also ==
- 1999 NCAA Division I Men's Lacrosse Championship
- NLL records
- University of Delaware Mens Lacrosse

Preceded by None	Major League Lacrosse Offensive Player of the Year; 2001	Succeeded by Mark Millon
Preceded by Jesse Hubbard	NLL Rookie of the Year; 2000	Succeeded by Tracy Kelusky
Preceded by Steve Dietrich	NLL Most Valuable Player; 2007	Succeeded by Athan Iannucci
Preceded by Jeff Shattler	NLL Most Valuable Player; 2012	Succeeded by Shawn Evans
Preceded by Gavin Prout	Champion's Cup MVP; 2007	Succeeded by Mark Steenhuis
Preceded by Ryan Powell	Major League Lacrosse Offensive Player of the Year; 2007, 2008	Succeeded by Paul Rabil
Preceded by Ryan Powell	Major League Lacrosse MVP; 2007, 2008	Succeeded by Paul Rabil
Preceded by Casey Powell	USILA National Collegiate Player of the Year; 1999	Succeeded by Ryan Powell
Preceded by Casey Powell	Jack Turnbull Award; 1999	Succeeded by Ryan Powell
