= 2011 Denver Outlaws season =

2011 Denver Outlaws
- League: Major League Lacrosse
- 2011 record: 7-5
- Home record: 2-4
- Road record: 5-1
- General Manager: Tony Seaman
- Coach: Tom Slate
- Arena: Invesco Field at Mile High

The 2011 Denver Outlaws season was the sixth season for the team. Attempting to improve from their 8-4 record and avenge their loss in the semifinal in the previous season, the Outlaws finished with a 7-5 record and returned to the playoffs for the sixth consecutive year but would lose in the semifinal against the Hamilton Nationals by the score of 11-9.

== Offseason ==
In mid-January, Brian Reese stepped down as head coach and general manager. It was later announced that associate head coach and defensive coordinator, Tom Slate, would be named the team's new coach. Reese left with a record of 32-17, a .653 winning percentage.

=== 2011 Draft ===
The following are the eight picks made by the Outlaws in the 2011 MLL Draft.

Round	Pick	Name	Position	Height	Weight	College	Hometown
1	3	Billy Bitter	Attackman	6'0"	170 lbs.	North Carolina	Manhasset, New York
2	9	Steve Serling	Midfielder	6'0"	180 lbs.	Hofstra	Rockville Centre, New York
3	15	Brett Schmidt	Defenseman	6'0"	175 lbs.	Maryland	Maple Glen, Pennsylvania
4	21	Grant Catalino	Attackman	6'5"	225 lbs.	Maryland	Webster, New York
5	27	Jack McBride	Attackman	5'10"	195 lbs.	Princeton	Madison, New Jersey
6	33	Andrew Irving	Midfielder	5'9"	185 lbs.	Notre Dame	McLean, Virginia
7	39	Andrew Lay	Midfielder	6'3"	200 lbs.	Denver	Denver, Colorado
8	45	Adam Ghitelman	Goalie	5'9"	186 lbs.	Virginia	Syosset, New York

== Regular season ==
Date	Opponent	Stadium	Result	Record
May 14	Hamilton Nationals	Invesco Field at Mile High	W 18-10	1-0
May 21	at Boston Cannons	Harvard Stadium	W 13-12	2-0
June 3	at Long Island Lizards	James M. Shuart Stadium	W 11-10	3-0
June 11	Chesapeake Bayhawks	Invesco Field at Mile High	L 15-16	3-1
June 18	at Hamilton Nationals	Ron Joyce Stadium	W 15-7	4-1
June 25	Long Island Lizards	Invesco Field at Mile High	W 18-11	5-1
July 3	Boston Cannons	Invesco Field at Mile High	L 12-15	5-2
July 16	Rochester Rattlers	Invesco Field at Mile High	L 8-9	5-3
July 23	at Rochester Rattlers	Sahlen's Stadium	L 8-15	5-4
July 30	Boston Cannons	Invesco Field at Mile High	L 9-10	5-5
August 6	at Long Island Lizards	James M. Shuart Stadium	W 14-11	6-5
August 13	at Chesapeake Bayhawks	Navy–Marine Corps Memorial Stadium	W 15-9	7-5

=== Postseason ===
Date	Opponent	Location	Result
August 27	Hamilton Nationals	Navy–Marine Corps Memorial Stadium	L 9-11

== Standings ==
Team	W	L	PCT	GB	GF	2ptGF	GA	2ptGA
Boston Cannons	9	3	.750	-	164	9	133	9
Denver Outlaws	7	5	.583	2	150	6	123	12
Hamilton Nationals	7	5	.583	2	151	4	142	8
Chesapeake Bayhawks	6	6	.500	3	129	10	160	2
Long Island Lizards	5	7	.417	4	124	14	140	11
Rochester Rattlers	2	10	.167	7	134	9	154	10

Playoff Seed
