= 2003 World Indoor Lacrosse Championship =

Tournament details
- Host country: Canada
- Venue(s): 4 (in 4 host cities)
- Dates: May 15–24
- Teams: 6

Final positions
- Champions: Canada (1st title)
- Runners-up: Haudenosaunee
- Third place: United States
- Fourth place: Scotland

Tournament statistics
- Games played: 20
- Goals scored: 415 (20.75 per game)
- Attendance: 7,132 (357 per game)

The 2003 World Indoor Lacrosse Championship was the first World Indoor Lacrosse Championship, an international box lacrosse tournament organized by the Federation of International Lacrosse every four years. It took place from May 15 to 24 in Hamilton, Kitchener, Mississauga, and Oshawa, Ontario, Canada. Canada won the gold medal with a 21–4 victory over the Iroquois Nationals. The United States defeated Scotland 15–9 in the bronze medal game. Two other nations participated, Australia and the Czech Republic.

== Preliminary round ==
Six participating teams played a round-robin in the preliminary round. The first place through fourth place teams each advanced to the semi-finals, while the fifth and sixth place teams advanced to the 5th place playoff.

=== Results ===
Team	GP	W	L	GF	GA	DIF	PTS	Advanced to
Canada	5	5	0	109	29	+80	5	Semi-finals
Haudenosaunee	5	4	1	100	52	+48	4	Semi-finals
Scotland	5	3	2	63	69	−6	3	Semi-finals
United States	5	2	3	75	65	+10	2	Semi-finals
Australia	5	1	4	39	102	−63	1	5th place playoff
Czech Republic	5	0	5	29	98	−69	0	5th place playoff

All times are local (UTC−4).

15 May 2003; 12:00	Haudenosaunee	19–12	Scotland	Oshawa Civic Auditorium, Oshawa

15 May 2003; 16:00	United States	22–9	Czech Republic	Oshawa Civic Auditorium, Oshawa

15 May 2003; 19:30	Canada	28–5	Australia	Oshawa Civic Auditorium, Oshawa

16 May 2003; 12:00	Czech Republic	3–15	Scotland	Oshawa Civic Auditorium, Oshawa

16 May 2003; 16:00	United States	22–4	Australia	Oshawa Civic Auditorium, Oshawa

16 May 2003; 19:30	Canada	15–13	Haudenosaunee	Oshawa Civic Auditorium, Oshawa

18 May 2003; 12:00	United States	12–15	Scotland	Hershey Centre, Mississauga

18 May 2003; 16:00	Haudenosaunee	24–7	Australia	Hershey Centre, Mississauga

18 May 2003; 19:30	Canada	25–1	Czech Republic	Hershey Centre, Mississauga

19 May 2003; 12:00	Australia	13–12	Czech Republic	Hershey Centre, Mississauga

19 May 2003; 16:00	Canada	25–5	Scotland	Hershey Centre, Mississauga

19 May 2003; 19:30	United States	14–21	Haudenosaunee	Hershey Centre, Mississauga

21 May 2003; 12:00	Scotland	16–10	Australia	Kitchener Memorial Auditorium, Kitchener

21 May 2003; 16:00	Czech Republic	4–23	Haudenosaunee	Kitchener Memorial Auditorium, Kitchener

21 May 2003; 19:30	Canada	16–5	United States	Kitchener Memorial Auditorium, Kitchener

== Final round ==
Semi-finals
Canada	17
United States	9
Haudenosaunee	22
Scotland	8

Gold medal game
Canada	21
Haudenosaunee	4
Bronze medal game
United States	15
Scotland	9

All times are local (UTC−4).

=== 5th place game ===
22 May 2003; 12:00	Australia	21–10	Czech Republic	Kitchener Memorial Auditorium, Kitchener

=== Semi-finals ===
22 May 2003; 16:00	Canada	17–9	United States	Kitchener Memorial Auditorium, Kitchener

22 May 2003; 19:30	Haudenosaunee	22–8	Scotland	Kitchener Memorial Auditorium, Kitchener

=== Bronze medal game ===
24 May 2003; 10:00	Scotland	9–15	United States	Copps Coliseum, Hamilton

=== Gold medal game ===
24 May 2003; 13:30	Canada	21–4	Haudenosaunee	Copps Coliseum, Hamilton; Attendance: 7,132

== Final standings ==
1st place, gold medalist(s)	Canada
2nd place, silver medalist(s)	Haudenosaunee
3rd place, bronze medalist(s)	United States
4	Scotland
5	Australia
6	Czech Republic
