= 2009 Major League Lacrosse season =

2009 MLL season
- League: Major League Lacrosse
- Sport: Field lacrosse
- Duration: May 2009 – August 2009
- Teams: 6

MLL seasons
- ← 2008 season 2010 season →

The 2009 Major League Lacrosse season was the ninth season of the league. The season began on May 15, 2009 and concluded with the championship game on August 23, 2009.

== Milestones & events ==
=== Rule changes ===
Major League Lacrosse announced some major rule changes in the off-season. The league will introduce a fourth long–stickman to play. For the first eight seasons the league operated, each team could only field three long–stick defenders on the field at a time. This rule was unique from the traditional men's field lacrosse rules played in high schools and colleges. The league will maintain the two–point goal and shot clock that differentiates Major League Lacrosse rules from high school and college lacrosse. In addition, the league announced that each team would be permitted to have one additional roster position to a total of nineteen players.

=== Team movement ===
- The Washington Bayhawks will move from the Washington D.C. area to Annapolis, Maryland. The Bayhawks have signed a three–year contract with the Naval Academy to play their home games at the Navy–Marine Corps Memorial Stadium. This move will be the Bayhawks sixth different home field in their nine years of existence.
- The Long Island Lizards will move their home games back to James M. Shuart Stadium, where they played in 2001 and 2002.
- The MLL announced on February 19 that the Los Angeles Riptide, Philadelphia Barrage, New Jersey Pride, Rochester Rattlers and San Francisco Dragons folded and a new team will play in Toronto. The league will consist of 6 teams. The Eastern and Western Conferences have been eliminated.
- The Rochester Rattlers' roster and staff will be transferred to the new Toronto Nationals team; however, the name, colors, and history are staying behind in Rochester to be potentially used by a future MLL team.
- For their home games, The Toronto Nationals played their inaugural season at BMO Field.

== Pre-season ==
- Casey, Ryan, and Mikey Powell, three of the best and most popular players in the league, all sat out for the 2009 season. The three brothers did not report to their respective teams as of the April 1 contract deadline - which means they are ineligible to play for anyone for the remainder of 2009. This was not the first time the Powell brothers sat out a season. The 2009 season was Mikey's third sitting out, while it is Casey's second, and Ryan's first.

== Standings ==
W = Wins, L = Losses, PCT = Winning Percentage, GB = Games Back of first place, GF = Goals For, 2ptGF = 2 point Goals For, GA = Goals Against, 2ptGA = 2 point Goals Against

Final

Qualified for playoffs

Team	W	L	PCT	GB	GF	2ptGF	GA	2ptGA
Denver Outlaws	9	3	.750	–	166	8	138	6
Toronto Nationals	7	5	.583	2	184	4	172	9
Long Island Lizards	6	6	.500	3	125	4	144	9
Boston Cannons	6	6	.500	3	173	12	150	6
Washington Bayhawks	5	7	.417	4	148	14	175	9
Chicago Machine	3	9	.250	6	159	8	176	11

Long Island finished ahead of Boston base on head-to-head record 3-0.

== All Star Game ==
The 2009 game took place July 16 at Denver's INVESCO Field. The Old School beat the Young Guns 22-21 in overtime. Brian Langtry (Denver) was named the MVP for the game.

== Playoffs ==
The 2009 New Balance MLL Championship Weekend took place on Saturday and Sunday, August 22 and 23 at Navy–Marine Corps Memorial Stadium in Annapolis, Maryland. The two semifinal games were at 12 PM ET and 3 PM ET on Saturday. The Toronto Nationals and Denver Outlaws won their semi-final matchups and in the Championship game with 45 seconds left, Shawn Williams scored to give the Nationals a 10-9 lead and Toronto won the MLL championship.

Semifinals
1	Denver Outlaws	11
4	Boston Cannons	10
2	Toronto Nationals	14
3	Long Island Lizards	13

Steinfeld Cup Final
1	Denver Outlaws	9
2	Toronto Nationals	10

Merrick Thomson was named MVP for the playoffs

== Awards ==
=== Annual awards ===
Award	Winner	Team
MVP Award	Paul Rabil	Boston
Rookie of the Year Award	Dan Hardy	Denver
Coach of the Year Award	Brian Reese	Denver
Defensive player of the Year Award	Brodie Merrill	Toronto
Offensive player of the Year Award	Paul Rabil	Boston
Goaltender of the Year Award	Jesse Schwartzman	Denver
Sportsman of the Year Award	Tim Goettelmann	Long Island
Most Improved Player of the Year Award	Chris Eck	Boston
