= 2007 Major League Lacrosse collegiate draft =

2007 Collegiate Draft of Major League Lacrosse

# Overall	Team	Player	Position	College
Round 1
1	Chicago	Pat Heim	Midfielder	Penn State
2	Boston (from Washington)	Kip Turner	Goalkeeper	Virginia
3	Rochester	Alex Smith	Face-off	Delaware
4	Denver (from Long Island)	Drew Westervelt	Attackman	UMBC
5	Chicago (from New Jersey through Philadelphia then New Jersey)	Bill Looney	Midfielder	Navy
6	Los Angeles	Greg Downing	Midfielder	Fairfield
7	Rochester (from San Francisco)	Greg Rommel	Midfielder	Syracuse
8	Boston	David Mitchell	Attackman	Cornell
9	Boston (from Denver)	Ray Megill	Defenseman	Maryland
10	Long Island (from Philadelphia then Denver)	Matt McMonagle	Goalkeeper	Cornell
Round 2
11	Chicago	Jordan Hall	Midfielder	Delaware
12	Los Angeles (from Washington)	Mitch Belisle	Defenseman	Cornell
13	Rochester	Andrew Spack	Midfielder	Loyola
14	Denver (from Long Island)	Zachary Jungers	Defenseman	Princeton
15	Chicago (from New Jersey)	Steve Whittenberg	Defenseman	Maryland
16	San Francisco (from Los Angeles)	Colin Hulme	Defenseman	Colgate
17	Los Angeles (from San Francisco)	Alex Buckley	Midfielder	Brown
18	San Francisco (from Boston)	Jake Byrne	Attackman	Johns Hopkins
19	Rochester (from Denver)	Matt Dasinger	Midfielder	Salisbury
20	Chicago (from Philadelphia)	Dan Kallaugher	Face-off	Loyola
Round 3
21	Boston (from Chicago through Washington)	Drew Thompson	Midfielder	Virginia
22	Washington	Frank Resetarits	Attackman	Albany
23	Rochester	Brian Clayton	Midfielder	Cornell
24	Chicago (from Long Island)	Steve Panarelli	Defenseman	Syracuse
25	New Jersey (from New Jersey through Chicago)	Chris Colliniates	Face-off	Villanova
26	Washington (from Los Angeles)	Ricky Smith	Defenseman	Virginia
27	Philadelphia (from San Francisco)	Peter Trombino	Attackman	Princeton
28	Chicago (from Boston )	Dan Deckelbaum	Midfielder	Delaware
29	Denver	Scott Sowanick	Midfielder	Princeton
30	Philadelphia	Ian Dingman	Attackman	Navy
Round 4
31	Long Island (from Chicago)	Adam Crystal	Defenseman	Drexel
32	Washington	John Henry Flood	Face-off	Harvard
33	Rochester	Joseph Thon	Defenseman	Mercyhurst
34	Long Island	Nick Bonacci	Attackman	Dartmouth
35	New Jersey	Ryan Hotaling	Attackman	Nazareth
36	Los Angeles	Julian Watts	Midfielder	Hofstra
37	San Francisco	Chris Heier	Defenseman	Salisbury
38	Boston	Brett Garber	Midfielder	Massachusetts
39	Denver	Jesse Schwartzman	Goalkeeper	Johns Hopkins
40	Philadelphia	Mike Graham	Defenseman	Loyola
Round 5
41	Long Island (from Chicago)	Brian Hubschmann	Attackman	Notre Dame
42	Washington	Luis Gonzalez	Midfielder	Salisbury
43	Rochester	Chad Amidon	Midfielder	Nazareth
44	Washington (from Long Island)	Eric Pittard	Attackman	Cornell
45	Chicago (from New Jersey)	Harry Alford	Goalkeeper	Maryland
46	Los Angeles	Jim Borell	Midfielder	Maryland
47	San Francisco	Andrew Recchione	Midfielder	Massachusetts
48	Boston	Dan Whipple	Defenseman	Massachusetts
49	Denver	Peter Hein	Midfielder	Vermont
50	Philadelphia	Mike Filippone	Midfielder	Drexel
