= Peet Poillon =

American lacrosse player (born 1987)

Personal information
- Nationality: American
- Born: May 21, 1987 (age 39) La Jolla, California, U.S.
- Height: 5 ft 9 in (175 cm)
- Weight: 165 lb (75 kg; 11 st 11 lb)

Sport
- Position: Midfield
- Shoots: Right
- NLL draft: 37th overall, 2009; Philadelphia Wings
- MLL team Former teams: Chesapeake Bayhawks; Chesapeake Bayhawks; Denver Outlaws; Charlotte Hounds
- NCAA team: Ohio State University; University of Maryland, Baltimore County
- Pro career: 2009–

Peet Poillon (born May 21, 1987, in La Jolla, California) is a professional lacrosse player who played for the Chesapeake Bayhawks of Major League Lacrosse.

== Playing career overview ==
Poillon was a two-time All-American for Ohio State University and University of Maryland, Baltimore County. In 2009, he was selected a Second Team All-American for UMBC and in 2008 he led Ohio State to a 15 to 7 first-round upset of Cornell.

Poillon attended Seneca Valley High School north of Pittsburgh, where he was an All-American in lacrosse and where Poillon and his father started up lacrosse as a varsity sport. Poillon's father attended school board meetings and Peet collected signatures to make the lacrosse program happen at Seneca Valley. Poillon set the Western Pennsylvania Scholastic Lacrosse Association's scoring record with 410 career points. Unfortunately these achievements did not get him much attention and so Poillon attended Howard Community College for two years in hopes of getting noticed by Division I coaches. As a two-time NJCAA All-American, Poillon scored over 140 points as well as finally got the Division I notice he wanted and headed to Ohio State in 2007.

Poillon was selected 20th overall in the 2009 Major League Lacrosse Collegiate Draft by the Boston Cannons. He never saw any playing time with the Cannons and was claimed by the Bayhawks in the MLL Player Pool. Poillon was named the MLL most improved player for 2010 as he helped Washington to the 2010 MLL Championship.

== Coaching career overview ==
In 2011, Poillon took over the head coach position at his alma mater, Seneca Valley High, leading to the Western Pennsylvania playoffs in what amounted to a turnaround season for the club. In December 2012, it was announced that Poillon had taken a position with the University of Delaware as volunteer assistant. In 2014, he accepted the role of assistant coach and offensive coordinator at Hobart College.

In 2019, Poillon was named associate head coach and offensive coordinator at Marquette.

== Statistics ==
=== College ===
Season	GP	G	A	Pts	PPG
2006 (Howard Community College)	--	--	--	84	--
2007 (Howard Community College)	--	--	--	60	--
2008 (OSU)	17	32	9	41	--
2009 (UMBC)	16	26	22	48	--
Totals	33	58	31	89 *	--

*233 total career points including junior college totals

=== MLL ===
		Regular Season							Playoffs
Season	Team	GP	G	2ptG	A	Pts	LB	PIM	GP	G	2ptG	A	Pts	LB	PIM
2009	Washington Bayhawks	2	7	--	--	7	16	-	-	-	-	-	-	-	-
2010	Chesapeake Bayhawks	12	24	2	15	41	7	2	-	-	-		-	-	-
2011	Denver Outlaws	12	20	1	4	25	1	1	-	-	-		-	-	-
2012	Denver Outlaws	11	24	3	13	40	3	2	-	-	-	-	-	-
2013	Charlotte Hounds	13	23	5	5	33	15	1	2	2	--	--	2	2	--
MLL Totals		45	68	6	12	88	65	2.5	-	-	-	-	-	-	-

== Accomplishments ==
- 2010 MLL Steinfeld Cup Champion (Chesapeake Bayhawks)
- 2010 MLL Most Improved Player

== See also ==
- UMBC Retrievers men's lacrosse
- Lacrosse in Pennsylvania
