= 2020 Denver Outlaws season =

2020 Denver Outlaws
- League: Major League Lacrosse
- 2020 record: 4-1
- General Manager: Tony Seaman
- Coach: Tony Seaman
- Arena: Peter Barton Lacrosse Stadium

The 2020 Denver Outlaws season was the 15th and final season for the Outlaws in Major League Lacrosse. The Outlaws were coming off of another championship loss after going 9–7 in the previous year and were looking to bounce back for their fourth Steinfeld Cup title. They would only go 4–1 on the season due to the COVID-19 pandemic. They would make the playoffs again but would lose to the Boston Cannons in the title game by a 13–10 score.

== Shortened season ==
The Outlaws along with the other five remaining teams were originally slated to play a ten-game regular season that was originally scheduled to begin on May 30. However, due to the rising number of COVID-19 cases, the league suspended the season until July 18. The 2020 season ended up being a five-game regular season and all games including the playoffs were played at Navy–Marine Corps Memorial Stadium, home of the Chesapeake Bayhawks.

== Regular season ==
=== Schedule ===
Date	Opponent	Stadium	Result	Record	Attendance
July 18	Connecticut Hammerheads	Navy–Marine Corps Memorial Stadium	W 18-6	1-0	0
July 19	at Philadelphia Barrage	Navy–Marine Corps Memorial Stadium	W 15-10	2-0	0
July 21	at New York Lizards	Navy–Marine Corps Memorial Stadium	W 12-11	3-0	0
July 22	Chesapeake Bayhawks	Navy–Marine Corps Memorial Stadium	W 13-12	4-0	0
July 24	at Boston Cannons	Navy–Marine Corps Memorial Stadium	L 8-10	4-1	0

=== Postseason ===
The playoffs originally included the Connecticut Hammerheads facing the Chesapeake Bayhawks while the Outlaws face the Boston Cannons in the semifinals. However, a player exhibited COVID-19 symptoms and was placed on quarantine. Later, he tested positive and would put the Bayhawks and Hammerheads in quarantine. Both teams forfeited from the playoffs and the Cannons and Outlaws would square off in the championship game on July 26 instead. The Cannons won their second Steinfeld Cup over the Outlaws by a 13–10 score.

== Standings ==
2020 Major League Lacrosse Standings
	W	L	PCT	GB	GF	2ptGF	GA	2ptGA
Denver Outlaws	4	1	.800	-	66	0	48	1
Connecticut Hammerheads	3	2	.600	1	51	0	57	0
Chesapeake Bayhawks	3	2	.600	1	67	3	63	1
Boston Cannons	3	2	.600	1	57	2	58	0
Philadelphia Barrage	2	3	.400	2	57	0	64	0
New York Lizards	0	5	.000	4	57	0	65	3

Playoff Seed
