= Jeremy Boltus =

American lacrosse player

Personal information
- Nationality: American
- Born: June 25, 1989 (age 37) Syracuse, New York, U.S.
- Height: 6 ft 1 in (185 cm)
- Weight: 180 lb (82 kg; 12 st 12 lb)

Sport
- Position: Forward/Transition
- Shoots: Right
- MLL team: Rochester Rattlers
- NCAA team: Army Black Knights

Career highlights
- First Team All-Patriot League; 2011 MLL Cascade Rookie of the Year; 2015 MLL All-Star Selection

Jeremy Boltus (born June 25, 1989 in Syracuse, New York) is a lacrosse player for the Rochester Rattlers in Major League Lacrosse.

== Professional MLL career ==
Jeremy Boltus was selected with the 43rd pick of the eighth round by the now defunct Hamilton Nationals in the 2011 Major League Lacrosse Collegiate Draft. In his rookie season Boltus appeared in all 12 games and led the team in scoring with 19 goals along with 11 assists and was chosen as the 2011 Cascade MLL Rookie of the Year. Prior to the 2012 season, Boltus was selected by the Charlotte Hounds with the 2nd overall pick in the 2012 Expansion Draft. He played for the Hounds in 11 games, gaining 17 goals and 12 assists before a season ending ACL Tear injury. Botlus began play with the Denver Outlaws for the 2013 season and finished the season with 10 goals and 6 assists through 10 games. Boltus sat out the 2014 season and instead served in the U.S. Army in Afghanistan. Boltus started his 2015 campaign with the Rattlers and finished the season appearing in 11 games for a total of 18 goals and three assists. Boltus appeared in the 2015 MLL All Star game where you get MVP honors after scoring 6 goals. Boltus was drafted with the first overall pick of the 2016 supplemental draft by the Atlanta Blaze only to be traded a day later back to Rochester.

== Prep and college career ==
At Army, Boltus played in 63 games managing to gather up 214 points and 124 assists. Boltus was named first team All-Patriot League in his Junior and Senior season.
