= Scotland national indoor lacrosse team =

National sports team

Scotland Box Lacrosse
- Association: Lacrosse Scotland
- Confederation: ELF (Europe)
- Head coach: Mike Simpson
- Arena: Manhattan Works - Dundee

World Championship
- Appearances: 2 (first in 2003)

The Scotland national indoor lacrosse team represents Scotland at box lacrosse. It is governed by Lacrosse Scotland.

== Scotland national indoor lacrosse team history ==
The inaugural World Indoor Lacrosse Championship (WILC) was held in Hamilton, Kitchener, Mississauga, and Oshawa, Ontario, Canada in May 2003. National teams from Australia, Canada, the Czech Republic, the Iroquois Nation, Scotland and the United States participated. The World Indoor Lacrosse Championship was sponsored by the International Lacrosse Federation through 2007. The team attended the second championship in 2007. The championship is now sponsored by World Lacrosse (formally the Federation of International Lacrosse). The Box (Indoor) lacrosse program within Scotland and the Scotland national indoor lacrosse team was reformed in 2018 after not attending the 2011 and 2015 World Indoor Lacrosse Championships.

The team as of 2021 is under the management of Brendan Cook (general manager), Mike Simpson (head coach), Bob Heyes (assistant coach) and Dylan Cowman (assistant coach) . Trials are currently underway for the European Indoor Lacrosse Championships 2021 in Hanover, Germany.

== World Indoor Lacrosse Championships 2019 ==
The team as of 2018 was under the management of Brendan Cook (general manager), Brian Witmer (head coach) and Navi Mahal (assistant coach). The team attended the European Box lacrosse invitational (EBox) in 2018 and again in 2019. The team attended the World Indoor Lacrosse Championships 2019 in Langley, Canada and finished 16th out of 20 teams having been seeded at 16th. The national team roster is posted below.

Pos.	No.	Player	Team	Nationality
Goaltender	44	Dylan Cowman	(Scotland) Glasgow Clydesiders	(Canada)
Goaltender	35	Chris Knowles	Scotland Grizzlies	(Scotland)
Goaltender	77	Craig McFeeters	(Canada) Port Moody	(Canada)
Defenseman	1	Nye Gordon	(England) London Raptors	(Scotland)
Defenseman	28	Peter Shepherd	Scotland Grizzlies	(Scotland)
Defenseman	42	Sam Vickars	(Scotland) Glasgow Clydesiders	(Canada)
Defenseman	8	John McIntyre	(Scotland) Strathclyde University	(Scotland)
Defenseman	91	John King	(Scotland) Edinburgh City	(Scotland)
Defenseman	2	Jorel Doherty	(England) London Raptors	(Australia)
Defenseman	23	Ben Robertson	(Scotland) Edinburgh City	(Scotland)
Defenseman	32	Colin Weir	(Scotland) Stirling Stags	(Scotland)
Transition	16	Iain Murray	(England) London Raptors	(Canada)
Transition	21	Matt Hill	(Scotland) Glasgow Clydesiders	(Scotland)
Transition	3	Colin Gill	(Scotland) Edinburgh City	(England)
Attackman	93	Cole Paciejewski	(Canada) RPR Mechanical/BX Pub Bandits	(Canada)
Attackman	12	Tom Becque	(Scotland) Edinburgh City	(England)
Attackman	10	Thomas Moffat	(Canada) Langley Thunder	(Canada)
Attackman	13	Tim Mottram	(England) Leeds City	(Scotland)
Attackman	24	Iain Vickars	(England) Hillcroft	(Canada)
Attackman	17	Michael Barclay	(Scotland) Edinburgh City	(England)
Attackman	11	Trevor Jackson	(Scotland) Glasgow Clydesiders	(United States)
Attackman	36	Martin Crawford	(Scotland) Edinburgh City	(Scotland)
Attackman	22	Johny Shaw	(Scotland) Glasgow City	(Scotland)

== ILF World Indoor Championships history ==
=== 2019 World Championship ===
2019 World Championship Group play
TEAM	GP	W	L	GF	GA	PTS
Czech Republic	4	4	0	68	21	8
Germany	4	3	1	67	29	6
Slovakia	4	2	2	51	56	4
Scotland	4	1	3	46	60	2
Mexico	4	0	4	26	92	0

Playoffs: Scotland vs Hong Kong (12–10 Win) Scotland vs Australia (5–29 Loss) Scotland vs Slovakia (12–14 Loss) Scotland vs Sweden (9–18 Loss)

16th Place overall finish

=== 2007 World Championship ===
2007 World Championship
GROUP 'A'	GP	W	L	GF	GA	PTS
Canada	3	3	0	67	10	6
United States	3	2	1	44	27	4
Australia	3	1	2	27	51	2
Ireland	3	0	3	9	59	0
GROUP 'B'	GP	W	L	GF	GA	PTS
Iroquois Nationals	3	3	0	70	16	6
England	3	2	1	32	41	4
Scotland	3	1	2	22	43	2
Czech Republic	3	0	3	20	44	0

Quarter-finals: 18 May 2007 - England defeated Australia 15-11; USA defeated Scotland 17-9

Fifth Place Match: 19 May 2007 - Scotland defeated Australia 14-8

=== 2003 World Championship ===
2003 World Championship
TEAM	GP	W	L	GF	GA	PTS
Canada	5	5	0	109	29	10
Iroquois Nationals	5	4	1	100	52	8
Scotland	5	3	2	63	69	6
United States	5	2	3	75	65	4
Australia	5	1	4	39	102	2
Czech Republic	5	0	5	29	98	0

Semi-finals: 22 May 2003 - Canada defeated USA 17-9; Iroquois Nationals defeated Scotland 22-8

Bronze Medal Match: 24 May 2003 - USA defeated Scotland 15-9
