= Chicago Machine (MLL) =

American lacrosse team

- Founded: 2006
- Folded: 2010
- League: MLL
- Based in: Bridgeview, Illinois
- Stadium: Toyota Park
- Colors: Light blue, white, black
- Head coach: John Combs
- General manager: John Meister

The Chicago Machine were a Major League Lacrosse franchise from 2006 until 2010. The Machine, a men's professional field lacrosse team, played in Toyota Park from 2007 until 2009. Chicago played all its "home" games at various stadiums across the country in 2010. Over its five-year history, the Chicago Machine were 13–47 and never made the playoffs. Following the 2011 season, their players were transferred to the Rochester Rattlers.

== Franchise history ==
The establishment of a Chicago Major League Lacrosse expansion franchise was announced on August 21, 2005. Along with expansion teams representing Los Angeles, San Francisco, and Denver, the Chicago Machine became part of the Western Conference of the MLL in 2006. The team played its home games in 2006 at the Sports Complex at Benedictine University in Lisle, Illinois.

The team's first year is to date the only MLL team to go the whole season without a victory. The team lead most of the game against the Dragons on August 12, only to see the Dragons tie the game at the end of regulation and then win the game in overtime.

In 2007, the Machine moved its home field to Toyota Park in Bridgeview, Illinois. After losing their season opener in 2007, the Machine won their first game in franchise history on June 2 defeating Denver. The Machine had lost a league record 13 consecutive games.

From 2006 to 2008, they were in the Western Conference. With the MLL contraction for the 2009 season from 10 to 6 teams, the league was no longer split into conferences.

John Meister first signed on with the Chicago Machine in March 2006. He helped to start the team and was the team's President from 2006–2009. After Kevin Finneran was fired from the Chicago Machine after the inaugural season, John Meister took on the role of general manager as well as President of the Chicago Machine. He left the Chicago Machine in September 2009.

John Algie took over as President for the 2010 season. That year the team competed as a traveling team with its "home" games being scheduled in a variety of potential MLL expansion markets. After the 2010 season, the Machine franchise moved to Rochester, New York and would assume the team marks and history of the inactive Rochester Rattlers franchise, which had moved to Toronto to become the Toronto Nationals. The new Rattlers team would play at Capelli Sport Stadium, where the original Rattlers had played before their relocation.

In 2012, the expansion franchise in Columbus, Ohio chose to borrow the Machine's name and colors, becoming the Ohio Machine, although there is no formal relationship between the teams.

== General managers ==
- Kevin Finneran (2006)
- John H. Meister (2007–2009)

== All-time head coaches ==
- Kevin Finneran – (2006)
- Lelan Rogers – (2007)
- John Combs – (2008–2009)
- B.J. O'Hara – (2010)

== Players of note ==
Both current Machine star Doug Shanahan (midfielder) and former star Todd Rassas (defensemen) were named to the 2006 USA team after competing together in the 2002 World Championships. The 2006 USA team competed in the IFL World Championships in Ontario, Canada from July 13–22, 2006.

Machine attackman, Kevin Leveille, was named to play in the 2006 Major League Lacrosse All-Star game on July 6, 2006 in Boston, MA. Leveille was also named an alternate on the 2006 USA team to compete in the IFL World Championships in Ontario, Canada from July 13–22, 2006.

Michael Culver, Machine defenseman, was voted 2006 New Balance Sportsman of the year by both general managers and coaches of each of the ten Major League Lacrosse teams. Culver received this award after starting all 10 games for the Machine and recording 27 ground balls. Culver is a leader both on the field and off. Off the field he helped the community by donating half of his 2006 salary to the Children's Heart Foundation.

In the November 2005 expansion draft, the Chicago Machine drafted Philadelphia Barrage Midfielder Doug Shanahan as their first pick.

The Chicago Machine also drafted Todd Rassas in the 2005 supplemental draft. He is a local product from Northfield, Illinois. He was a three time All-American at Notre Dame, Captain of the 2002 Gold Medal Team USA and part of the 2006 Team USA.

Another Machine draftee, Lyle Shirley, is a member of the Athletic Hall of Fame at Lake Forest College.

It is not uncommon for retired athletes to become sports broadcasters when they retire. However, the Chicago Machine may be the first team to have a former broadcaster become a professional player. In the December 2005 supplemental draft, the Machine drafted former WCAV-TV anchor Zach Heffner.

== Season-by-season ==
Chicago Machine
Year	W	L	Regular season finish	Playoffs
2006	0	12	4th in Western Conference	—
2007	3	9	4th in Western Conference	—
2008	3	9	4th in Western Conference	—
2009	3	9	6th in MLL	—
2010	4	8	5th in MLL	—
Totals	13	47	Regular Season Win % = .217	Total Playoff Record 0 – 0 Playoff Win % = .000
