= Jesse Schwartzman =

American lacrosse player

Personal information
- Nickname: Bear
- Nationality: American
- Born: 14 November 1985 (age 40) Baltimore, Maryland, U.S.
- Height: 6 ft 1 in (185 cm)
- Weight: 220 lb (100 kg; 15 st 10 lb)
- Website: jesseschwartzman.com

Sport
- Position: Goalie
- MLL team: Denver Outlaws
- NCAA team: Johns Hopkins University

Jesse Schwartzman (born November 14, 1985, in Baltimore, Maryland) is a professional lacrosse player for the Denver Outlaws of Major League Lacrosse. Prior to playing professionally, he played his collegiate lacrosse at the Johns Hopkins University.

== High school ==
A native of Owings Mills, Maryland, Schwartzman attended Pikesville High School in Pikesville, Maryland (Baltimore County) from 2000-2004 where he won the State Championship as a sophomore.

== College career ==
Schwartzman attended the Johns Hopkins University from 2004-2008. As a sophomore, the Blue Jays goalie lead his team to an undefeated season (16-0) culminating in the 2005 NCAA Championship. Again in 2007, his senior year, Schwartzman was the last line of defense for the 2007 National Champions. In both the 2005 and 2007 NCAA tournament, Schwartzman was named Most Outstanding Player.

== Professional career ==
Schwartzman was selected by the Denver Outlaws with the 39th overall pick in the 2007 Major League Lacrosse draft. Now in his 7th season, Schwartzman has compiled a career record of 58–19 with a .763 winning percentage, which ranks first all-time. He also holds the MLL record for career goals against average (11.28). Twice named Goalie of the Year in 2009 & 2013, Schwartzman is the only goalie in MLL history to give up an average of fewer than 10 goals per game. In 2011, he set the GA (Goals Against) record with a 9.87 average. In 2013, he bettered his own mark with a 9.67 average.

In 2013, the Denver Outlaws became just the fourth North American professional sports franchise to finish the regular season undefeated (14-0) joining the 2007 New England Patriots (16-0), the 1972 Miami Dolphins (14-0) and the 1948 Calgary Stampeders (14-0) of the CFL.

Schwartzman announced his retirement from professional lacrosse on July 25, 2015, at the conclusion of his final game.

== USA Lacrosse ==
Schwartzman was selected to tryout for the U.S. men's national team that will compete in the 2014 Federation of International Lacrosse World Championship in Denver, Colorado.

== Personal ==
Schwartzman is the second son of Robert & Deborah Schwartzman of Owings Mills, Maryland. His older brother, Andrew Schwartzman, played lacrosse for the University of Maryland leading his team to two Atlantic Coast Conference championships and two NCAA Final Fours.
