= San Francisco Dragons =

Field lacrosse team in California

- Founded: 2005
- Folded: 2008
- League: MLL
- Conference: Western
- Based in: San Francisco, California (2006–2007); San Jose, California (2008)
- Stadium: Kezar Stadium; Spartan Stadium
- Colors: Purple, White, Black
- Head coach: Tom Slate
- General manager: Doug Locker
- Local media: San Francisco Examiner; San Jose Mercury News; Comcast SportsNet West; KFOG

The San Francisco Dragons were a professional field lacrosse team based in San Francisco and San Jose, California. From 2006 to 2008, they played in Major League Lacrosse and they ceased operations before the 2009 season due to the 2008 financial crisis and the Great Recession.

== Franchise history ==
The San Francisco Dragons were awarded an MLL franchise in July 2005. The original owners were Michael Levitt, Chris Bulger, and Charley Biggs. The inaugural season commenced on May 28, 2006, against the Denver Outlaws. They lost the game 15–11, but went on to beat the Outlaws two times later in the season. The Dragons spent their first 2 seasons in Kezar Stadium. The Dragons had a strong inaugural season led by league MVP and Offensive Player of the Year, Ryan Powell. They finished the season 7–5 and a playoff team. They lost in the semifinals to emerging rivals the Denver Outlaws, 23–14.

On April 4, 2007 the Dragons were acquired by a local Bay Area investment group from the Dragons' previous East Coast owner.

The 2007 season began on May 19, with a loss in Denver to the Denver Outlaws, 14–21. The 2007 Home Opener was played on June 2 to a loss against the Long Island Lizards, 12-14.

For the 2008 season it was announced the Dragons would be moving 50 miles south to San Jose, California to play at Spartan Stadium and kept their name.

== Season-by-season ==
San Francisco Dragons
Year	W	L	Regular season finish	Playoffs
2006	7	5	2nd in Western Conference	Lost semifinal 23-14 to Outlaws
2007	4	8	3rd in Western Conference	---
2008	4	8	3rd in Western Conference	---
Totals	15	21	Regular Season Win % = .417	Total Playoff Record 0 - 1 Playoff Win % = .000

- 2006 San Francisco Dragons season
- 2007 San Francisco Dragons season
- 2008 San Francisco Dragons season

== Coaches and others ==
- President – Henry "Hank" Molloy
- Executive VP/General Manager – Doug Locker
- VP/Sales - James Martin
- Head coach – Tom Slate
- Assistant coach – Ned Webster
- Director of Game Ops – Gary Podesta
- Ticket Sales Manager – Neil Hueston
- Media Relations Manager – Mandy Marks
