= Australia national indoor lacrosse team =

The Australia national indoor lacrosse team represents Australia at indoor lacrosse. It is governed by Australian Lacrosse Association and are currently ranked 8th in the world. The team is a full member of the Federation of International Lacrosse. The next major event for the team will be the 2019 FIL World Indoor Lacrosse Championship, to be held in Langley, BC, Canada.

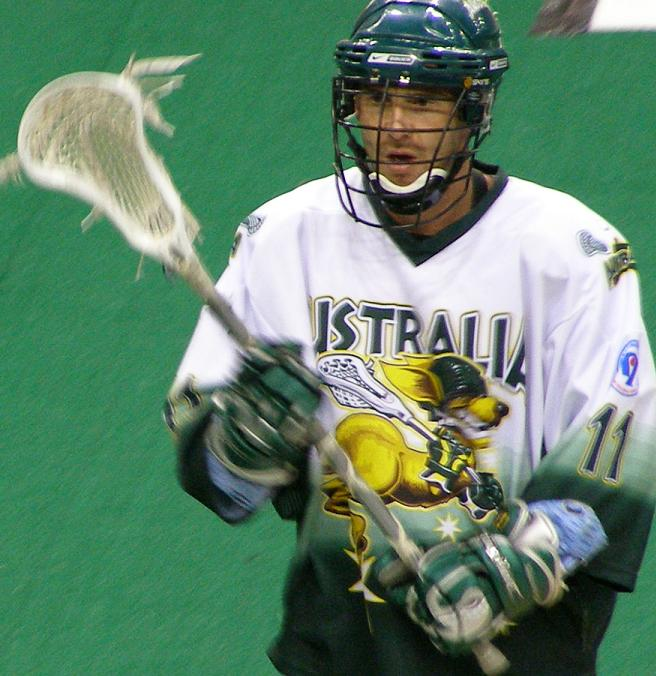
2007 World Indoor Lacrosse Championship in Halifax

2011 Australia indoor lacrosse team
Players	Coaches
0 Bill Martin; 1 Anthony Munro; 2 Jesse Whinnen; 3 Rod Maher; 4 Cam McLachlan; 6 Caleb Hall; 8 Marty Hyde; 9 Gordon Purdie; 10 Keith Nyberg; 11 Damien Cliffe; 13 Dwayne Edwards; 14 Anthony Feleppa; 18 Darren Nicholas; 19 Nigel Wapper; 20 Daniel Mentiplay; 22 Travis Gathercole; 23 Jeff Joy; 24 Sam Kilford; 29 Harrison Hirstopolous; 33 Ryan Stone; 35 Tim Fry; 36 Frank Nicholas; 42 Wade Hammond; 44 Clinton Lander; 49 Chris De Mello; 55 Pat McGrath-Campbell; 88 Dylan McDougall; 93 Jerome Kirkwood; 99 Jake Egan	Head coach: Rik Benedierks

== See also ==
- Lacrosse in Australia
- Australia men's national lacrosse team
- Australia women's national lacrosse team
