= Major League Lacrosse draft =

The Major League Lacrosse draft was the annual draft of outstanding amateur lacrosse players from American colleges and universities into the professional ranks of Major League Lacrosse (MLL). The North American league, made up of 9 teams, began conducting the draft in 2001, and continued to do so through its final season in 2020, after which it merged into the Premier Lacrosse League.

== First round picks ==
Season	Date	Location	MLL team	Player	Position	College	Source
2001	June 1, 2001	Radisson Hotel at Cross Keys, Baltimore, MD	Rochester Rattlers	Ryan Mollett	Defense	Princeton	
2002	June 2, 2002	Cawley Stadium, Lowell, MA	Rochester Rattlers	Josh Coffman	Midfielder	Syracuse	
2003	May 29, 2003	The Haverford School, Haverford, PA	Bridgeport Barrage	Chris Rotelli	Midfielder	Virginia	
2004	June 3, 2004	Sacred Heart University, Fairfield, CT	Baltimore Bayhawks	Michael Powell	Attack	Syracuse	
2005	June 1, 2005	Sacred Heart University, Fairfield, CT	New Jersey Pride	Kyle Harrison	Midfielder	Johns Hopkins	
2006	May 31, 2006	Sacred Heart University, Fairfield, CT	Rochester Rattlers	Joe Walters	Attack	Maryland	
2007	May 31, 2007	Stony Brook University, Stony Brook, NY	Chicago Machine	Pat Heim	Midfielder	Penn State	
2008	May 28, 2008	Stevens Institute of Technology, Hoboken, NJ	Boston Cannons	Paul Rabil	Midfielder	Johns Hopkins	
2009	May 27, 2009	Stevens Institute of Technology, Hoboken, NJ	Chicago Machine	Kenny Nims	Attack	Syracuse	
2010	June 6, 2010	Yale University, New Haven, CT	Chicago Machine	Ned Crotty	Attack	Duke	
2011	January 21, 2011	Pratt Street Power Plant, Baltimore, MD	Hamilton Nationals	Kevin Crowley	Midfielder	Stony Brook	
2012	January 13, 2012	Philadelphia Marriott's Liberty Ballroom, Philadelphia, PA	Long Island Lizards	Rob Pannell	Attack	Cornell	
2013	January 11, 2013	Philadelphia Marriott's Liberty Ballroom, Philadelphia, PA	Ohio Machine	Peter Baum	Attack	Colgate	
2014	January 10, 2014	Philadelphia Marriott's Liberty Ballroom, Philadelphia, PA	Ohio Machine	Tom Schreiber	Midfield	Princeton	
2015	January 23, 2015	Baltimore Convention Center, Baltimore, MD	Florida Launch	Lyle Thompson	Attack	Albany	
2016	January 22, 2016	Baltimore Convention Center, Baltimore, MD	Atlanta Blaze	Myles Jones	Midfield	Duke	
2017	May 28, 2017	Toby Keith's Bar and Grill, Foxoborough, MA	Florida Launch	Dylan Molloy	Attack	Brown	
2018	April 18, 2018	The U.S. Lacrosse Headquarters, Sparks, Maryland	Boston Cannons	Trevor Baptiste	Midfield	University of Denver	
2019	March 10, 2019	NASCAR Hall of Fame, Charlotte, North Carolina	Ohio Machine	Alex Woodall	Midfield	Towson University	
2020	May 4, 2020	Virtual	New York Lizards	T.D. Ierlan	Midfield	Yale University	

The full draft article is linked in the season column.
