= 2009 Boston Cannons season =

This is the 9th season for the Boston Cannons in Major League Lacrosse. The Cannons played in their home games at Harvard Stadium.

2009 Boston Cannons Season
Date & Time	Away team	Score	Home team	Score	Game Notes/Scoring Leader
May 16 @ 7 PM	Long Island	9	Boston	8	-
May 22 @ 7:30 PM	Denver	15	Boston	14	-
May 30 @ 3 PM	Boston	16	Chicago	14	-
June 5 @ 7 PM	Boston	13	Long Island	14	-
June 13 @ 7 PM	Chicago	11	Boston	22	-
June 19 @ 7:30 PM	Boston	19	Washington	9	-
June 25 @ 7 PM	Toronto	15	Boston	19	-
July 4 @ 7 PM	Boston	17	Denver	16	-
July 9 @ 7 PM	Boston	10	Long Island	11	-
July 18 @ 7 PM	Chicago	10	Boston	17	-
July 23 @ 7:30 PM	Boston	17	Toronto	18	-
August 6 @ 7:30 PM	Washington	14	Boston	13	-

== Current roster ==
2009 Boston Cannons
Number	Player's Name	Position	Height	Weight
4	Bobby Horsey	M	5-10	205 lbs
13	Brandon Corp	A	6-0	180 lbs
23	Brett Garber	M	5-11	170 lbs
24	Chris Eck	M	6-0	200 lbs
44	Chris Passavia	D	6-1	210 lbs
8	Greg Downing	M	6-1	195 lbs
18	Jack Reid	D	6-3	220 lbs
1	Johnny Christmas	A	5-10	175 lbs
30	John Ortolani	M	5-8	185 lbs
22	Justin Smith	M	5-8	165 lbs
32	Kevin Cassese	M	6-0	200 lbs
15	Kip Turner	G	6-1	179 lbs
77	Kyle Sweeney	D	5-10	195 lbs
3	Matt Alrich	A	5-10	220 lbs
26	Matt Casey	M	6-0	180 lbs
7	Matt Poskay	M	6-0	204 lbs
10	Mike Levin	G	6-1	185 lbs
33	Mike Podgajny	M	6-0	195 lbs
85	Mitch Belisle	D	5-9	195 lbs
2	Nate Evans	M	5-11	205 lbs
99	Paul Rabil	M	6-3	225 lbs
12	Ray Megill	D	6-0	200 lbs
14	Ryan Boyle	A	6-1	180 lbs
34	Ryan McClay	D	5-9	190 lbs
25	Sean Morris	A	6-3	190 lbs
9	Tom Zummo	M	6-0	185 lbs

- updated 1 September 2009
