= Boston Cannons =

American lacrosse team

- Sport: Field Lacrosse
- Founded: 2001
- League: Major League Lacrosse (2001–2020); Premier Lacrosse League (2020–present)
- Team history: Boston Cannons; 2001–2020 (MLL) Cannons Lacrosse Club; 2020–2023 (PLL) Boston Cannons; 2023–present
- Based in: Boston, Massachusetts
- Stadium: Harvard Stadium
- Colors: Navy blue, red, silver, white
- Head coach: Brian Holman
- Championships: 2 MLL: 2 (2011, 2020)
- Division titles: 2 MLL: 2 (2004, 2005)
- Championship Series Titles: 2 (2024, 2025)
- Website: Boston Cannons

Uniforms
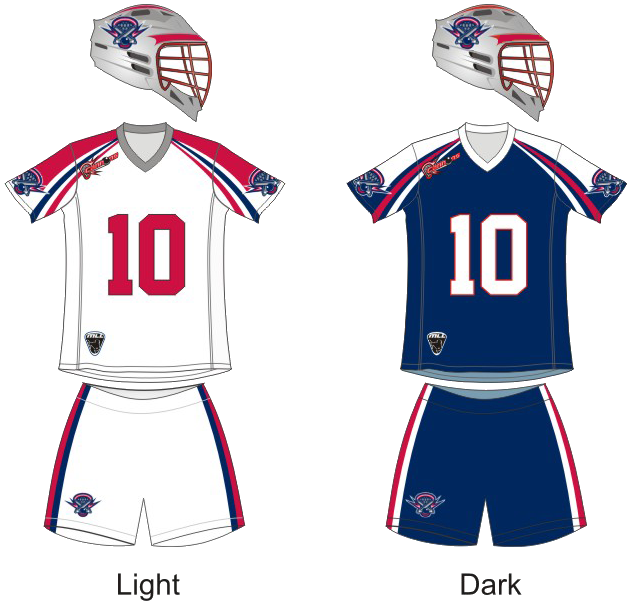

The Boston Cannons are a professional field lacrosse team based in Boston, Massachusetts, that competes in the Premier Lacrosse League (PLL). The team plays its home games at Harvard Stadium.

The team competed in Major League Lacrosse (MLL) from their inaugural 2001 season to 2020. The team's home field was Veterans Memorial Stadium in nearby Quincy. In the MLL, the team won two Steinfeld Cup championship games in 2011 and 2020, the latter being the MLL's final championship. The Cannons joined the PLL in 2020 following the MLL–PLL merger and were rebranded as the Cannons Lacrosse Club before later being rebranded as Boston Cannons once again when the PLL assigned home cities after the 2023 season.

== Franchise history ==
The Boston Cannons were one of the original six teams of Major League Lacrosse (MLL), and the only team from the pole inaugural 2001 season to stay in the same market, without folding or moving elsewhere. They were the only MLL team identity to continue into the 2021 PLL season following the MLL-PLL merger and in doing so adopted the Cannons Lacrosse identity. The team would once again become the Boston Cannons when the PLL assigned home cities after the 2023 season. MLL was founded by Jake Steinfeld, Dave Morrow, and Tim Robertson. The Cannons founder and president is Matt Dwyer. From their inaugural season of 2001 through 2003, the Cannons played their home games at Cawley Memorial Stadium in Lowell, Massachusetts. In their inaugural 2001 season, the Cannons finished with a record of 3–11 but still qualified for the playoffs finishing in second place in the division. In 2004, they moved to Nickerson Field at Boston University where they played through the 2006 season. In 2007, they moved to Harvard Stadium in Allston, a neighborhood in Boston, Massachusetts, which is less than 2 miles (3.2 km) from Nickerson Field and also within that distance from the Cannons' main office in Boston. The team qualified for the MLL playoffs 2001–2006, 2009-2011 and 2015. The Cannons won the 2004 and 2005 MLL American Division championships.

=== Major League Lacrosse (MLL) ===
==== 2011 championship season ====
The Cannons won the Steinfeld Cup for the first time in 2011, defeating the Hamilton Nationals 10–9. Boston went 9–3 in the regular season, their best record since going 10–2 in 2005. After losing to Chesapeake 13–9 in the 2010 semifinal, the Cannons avenged the Bayhawks by defeating them 14–13 in the 2011 semifinal with a goal from Max Quinzani. Boston became the fifth charter franchise to win a championship. By 2011, the Cannons were one of four charter franchises still in the league that started with six teams in 2001. The other three remaining charter franchises (Lizards, Bayhawks, and Rattlers had all previously won at least one Steinfeld Cup (the defunct Barrage had won three). Head coach Bill Daye stepped down a month after winning the Steinfeld Cup, citing he wanted to spend more time with his family. Entering the 2021 season, Daye remains the franchise's all-time leader in regular-season games coached (72), regular-season games won (43), and playoff games coached (6).

==== 2013–2018 ====
The Cannons in 2013 and 2014 finished 5–9 and 6–8. This included a 1–5 start in 2013 leading to Steve Duffy's firing on June 10. John Tucker took his place and played .500 for the rest of the season. After the Cannons missed the playoffs for the fourth time in franchise history in 2014, Tucker led the team back to the postseason in 2015 as the 8–6 fourth seed. They played the New York Lizards and lost 16–15 in overtime. The Lizards went on to win the Steinfeld Cup.

John Tucker left the Cannons after the 2015 season to become the first head coach and general manager of the expansion team Atlanta Blaze. On October 8, 2015, Sean Quirk was announced as the sixth head coach in franchise history. In an odd 2016 year in which seven of the league's nine teams, including the Cannons, finished with identical 8-6 records, Quirk's team was not rewarded with one of the four playoff spots after tie-breaking procedures. On December 20, 2016, it was announced that John Tucker would be returning to the Cannons as the team's offensive coordinator in 2017. Tucker was fired mid-season by the Blaze after a 3–7 start.

Despite a Week 1 win in 2017, the Cannons season turned around. At 3–6, the Cannons traded away captain Will Manny and Joe LoCascio to the New York Lizards for Dave Lawson and Chris LaPierre on June 27. On July 14, the Cannons announced that neither Lawson nor LaPierre would suit up for the team that season. Dave Lawson informed team officials that he would be retiring from the league while Chris LaPierre decided not to report to the team. The Cannons finished the season on a six-game losing streak. At 3-11, the Cannons posted the worst record in the league and tied their franchise-worst record from 2001, their inaugural season.

The final team logo for the Boston Cannons while members of the MLL

==== 2019–2020: new pro lacrosse landscape and second title ====
Following the 2018 season, Paul Rabil launched the Premier Lacrosse League, baiting over 140 MLL players to migrate over. However, the Cannons maintained more of their roster than other teams like the Dallas Rattlers or Rabil's New York Lizards. Two months prior to the start of the 2019 season, the league cut the team roster from nine to six when the Ohio Machine and Florida Launch folded and Charlotte Hounds suspended operations for two seasons. Taking this to their advantage, the Cannons posted a 9–7 record in 2019, good enough for the third of four postseason seeds and gave Boston its first playoff berth since 2015. Boston faced the Denver Outlaws in the semifinal, who were also hosting Championship Weekend. The Cannons got off to a hot start and led by as many as six goals, but ultimately fell, 17–15, ending their season.

2019 was the Cannons' first season in Quincy. During the offseason they announced a move to and $1.5 million renovation of Veterans Memorial Stadium. The Cannons announced two sellouts in their first season in the updated venue.

Due to the COVID-19 pandemic, the 2020 season was shortened to five regular season games in seven days, all to be played in front of no fans at Navy-Marine Corps Memorial Stadium in Annapolis, Maryland. The Cannons finished fourth place out of six teams with a 3–2 record, and were the only team to defeat the Denver Outlaws in the regular season. Heading into the postseason, the Cannons were scheduled to play the Outlaws in the semifinal. However, after a player from the Chesapeake Bayhawks experience symptoms of COVID-19 and eventually tested positive, the two other postseason competitors, Chesapeake and Connecticut, withdrew from the tournament. The Cannons' semifinal game with the Outlaws was pushed back a day and would be played as the championship. Boston defeated Denver for the second time in two days, the latter in 13-10 fashion for the franchise's second title, first in nine years. Newcomer attackman Bryce Wasserman, who played for the Dallas Rattlers the season before, was named league MVP for 2020.

=== Premier Lacrosse League ===
==== 2021–2023: Cannons Lacrosse Club ====
On December 16, 2020, in a statement from Major League Lacrosse (MLL), the Boston Cannons officially became the eighth team in the Premier Lacrosse League (PLL). It was announced that the team would be dropping "Boston" from their name and become "Cannons Lacrosse Club" to fit league nomenclature, the roster would be set via an expansion draft, and the team would begin play in the PLL in the 2021 season. Small tweaks to the former Boston Cannons branding resulted in a PLL crest and logo reveal on January 12, 2021. One week later, the league announced that Sean Quirk would continue coaching the team.

The Cannons played their first game of the 2021 season on June 4 at Gillette Stadium in Foxborough, Massachusetts, falling to the Redwoods Lacrosse Club, 12–11. They would finish the season 7th in the league, falling in the first round of the playoffs.

==== Post-2023 season-present: Boston Cannons ====
After the 2023 season the PLL assigned home cities to each of the eight teams. The Cannons were rebranded from Cannons Lacrosse Club to become the Boston Cannons. Since setting their "Homecoming Weekend" to the Harvard Stadium, the Cannons have performed well with two repeating 7-3 records in 2023 and 2024, a noticeable increase from their 3-6 record in 2022. However, they have yet to win the championship since establishing their home city, being bounced in the playoffs in the semi-final by the Philadelphia Waterdogs 17-6 in 2023 and by the Carolina Chaos 8-4 in the 2024 quarterfinals.

In 2024, The Boston Cannons won the 2024 Championship Series, beating the Philadelphia Waterdogs 23-22 in overtime.Then in the 2025 season, the Boston Cannons became the first team to go back to back in winning the Championship Series, defeating the Utah Archers 21-14 with Matt Campbell leading the way on offense with 8 points (7G, 1A). Campbell also won the Golden Stick Award for the most points (23 points) over the course of the series. Colin Kirst also set a record for the most saves during the 6v6 tournament, 72.

The 2025 PLL season begins on May 30, 2025 in Albany, NY. However, the Cannons don't begin their 2025 campaign until the next day, May 31, against the New York Atlas.

== General managers ==
- David Gross (2001–2005)
- Jason Chandler (2006–2007)
- Mark Kastrud (2008–2011)
- Kevin Barney (2011–2017)

== Current coaching staff ==
- Head coach – Brian Holman
- Assistant coach – Aaron Verardi
- Assistant coach – Will Manny

=== All-time head coaches ===
#	Name	Term	Regular season				Playoffs			
#	Name	Term	GC	W	L	W%	GC	W	L	W%
Boston Cannons
1	Mitch Whiteley	2002	14	3	11	.214	1	0	1	.000
2	Scott Hiller	2003–2005	50	32	18	.640	5	1	4	.200
3	Bill Daye	2006–2011	72	43	29	.597	6	2	4	.333
4	Steve Duffy	2012–2013	20	10	10	.500	1	0	1	.000
5	John Tucker	2013–2015	36	18	18	.500	1	0	1	.000
6	Sean Quirk	2016–2020	68	31	37	.456	3	2	1	.667
Cannons Lacrosse Club
—	Sean Quirk	2021–2022	19	4	15	.211	—	—	—	—
7	Brian Holman	2023	10	7	3	.700	2	1	1	.500
Boston Cannons
—	Brian Holman	2024–present	32	18	14	.563	3	1	2	.333

== Roster ==
2026 Boston Cannons
#	Name	Nationality	Position	Shot	Height	Weight	College	Grad year	High school	Hometown	Ref.
1	Marcus Holman (C)	(United States)	Attack	Right	5 ft 10 in	180 lbs	North Carolina	2013	Gilman	Baltimore, Maryland	
2	Tye Kurtz	(Canada)	Attack	Right	6 ft 0 in	200 lbs	Delaware	2023	Bishop MacDonnell	Puslinch, Ontario	
5	Colin Kirst (C)	(United States)	Goalie	Right	6 ft 2 in	211 lbs	Rutgers	2022	Seton Hall Prep	Bernardsville, New Jersey	
6	Hunter Smith	(United States)	Defense	Right	6 ft 2 in	220 lbs	Richmond	2026	McQuaid Jesuit	Rochester, New York	
7	Will Donovan	(United States)	LSM	Left	6 ft 0 in	190 lbs	Notre Dame	2026	Brunswick School	Greenwich, Connecticut	
8	Mikey Weisshaar	(United States)	Midfield	Right	5 ft 9 in	170 lbs	Towson	2026	Archbishop Spalding	Arnold, Maryland	
9	Michael Lampert	(United States)	Attack	R/L	5 ft 6 in	170 lbs	Denver	2024	Wayland	Wayland, Massachusetts	
11	Marquez White	(United States)	SSDM	Right	6 ft 0 in	185 lbs	Princeton	2024	Poway	Poway, California	
13	Jack Regnery	(United States)	Attack	Right	6 ft 0 in	190 lbs	Tufts	2026	The Benjamin School	Palm Beach Gardens, Florida	
14	Zach Goodrich (C)	(United States)	SSDM	Right	6 ft 2 in	185 lbs	Towson	2019	Kent Island	Stevensville, Maryland	
20	Matt Campbell	(United States)	Midfield	R/L	6 ft 2 in	210 lbs	Villanova	2023	Delbarton	Madison, New Jersey	
21	Mic Kelly	(United States)	Midfield	Right	6 ft 2 in	210 lbs	Denver	2025	Calvert Hall	Towson, Maryland	
22	** Ryan Drenner	(United States)	Midfield	R/L	6 ft 0 in	190 lbs	Towson	2017	Westminster	Finksburg, Maryland	
23	Logan Ip	(United States)	Midfield	R	5 ft 10 in	170 lbs	Harvard	2026	Corona del Mar	Newport Coast, California	
24	Ben Ramsey	(United States)	SSDM	Right	6 ft 0 in	200 lbs	Notre Dame	2025	Sacred Heart Prep	Palo Alto, California	
26	Andrew McMeekin	(United States)	Faceoff	Right	6 ft 1 in	225 lbs	Princeton	2026	Episcopal Academy	Newtown Square, Pennsylvania	
29	Remington Reynolds	(United States)	Defense	Left	6 ft 0 in	180 lbs	Loyola	2025	Gilman	Baltimore, Maryland	
30	Brian Kelly	(United States)	Attack	R/L	6 ft 0 in	180 lbs	St. John's	2025	Albany Academy	Red Hook, New York	
34	Connor Kirst	(United States)	Midfield	R/L	6 ft 3 in	208 lbs	Rutgers	2021	Delbarton	Bernardsville, New Jersey	
35	Ethan Rall	(United States)	LSM	Right	5 ft 9 in	186 lbs	Rutgers	2023	Islip	Islip, New York	
40	Jack Kielty (C)	(United States)	Defense	Right	6 ft 2 in	210 lbs	Notre Dame	2021	Delbarton	Morristown, New Jersey	
41	* Bryce Young	(United States)	Defense	Left	6 ft 2 in	205 lbs	Maryland	2018	St. Augustine	Egg Harbor Township, New Jersey	
43	Jeff Trainor	(Italy)	SSDM	R/L	6 ft 0 in	195 lbs	UMass	2021	Billerica Memorial	Billerica, Massachusetts	
45	Graydon Hogg	(Canada)	Midfield	Left	5 ft 9 in	180 lbs	Albany	2024	The Hill Academy	Oshawa, Ontario	
81	Owen Grant	(Canada)	LSM	Left	6 ft 3 in	230 lbs	Delaware	2023	Everest Academy	Newmarket, Ontario	
88	JC Higginbotham	(United States)	Goalie	Right	6 ft 0 in	200 lbs	Bellarmine	2024	Plano West	Plano, Texas	
91	Coulter Mackesy	(United States)	Attack	Left	5 ft 10 in	185 lbs	Princeton	2025	Brunswick	Bronxville, New York	

(C) indicates captain

*Indicates player is on Holdout list

**Indicates player is on PUP list

== MLL award winners ==
Most Valuable Player

- Conor Gill: 2004
- Paul Rabil: 2009, 2011
- Matt Poskay: 2010
- Bryce Wasserman: 2020

Rookie of the Year

- Conor Gill: 2002

Coach of the Year

- Scott Hiller: 2002, 2005
- Bill Daye: 2011
- John Tucker: 2015
- Sean Quirk: 2020

Defensive Player of the Year

- Ryan Curtis: 2003
- Zach Goodrich: 2020

Offensive Player of the Year

- Paul Rabil: 2009, 2011, 2012
- Matt Poskay: 2010

Goalie of the Year

- Chris Garrity: 2005
- Kip Turner: 2010

David Huntley Man of the Year

- Nick Marrocco: 2019

Most Improved Player

- Chris Eck: 2009
- Davey Emala: 2015

== PLL award winners ==
Eamon McEneaney Attackman of the Year

- Lyle Thompson: 2022
- Marcus Holman: 2023

Gait Brothers Midfielder of the Year

- Matt Campbell: 2025

Brodie Merrill Long Stick Midfielder of the Year

- Ethan Rall: 2026

Paul Cantabene Faceoff Athlete of the Year

- Andrew McMeekin: 2026

Welles Crowther Humanitarian Award

- Lyle Thompson: 2021, 2022

Jimmy Regan Teammate Award

- Brodie Merrill: 2022
- Connor Kirst: 2026

Dick Edell Coach of the Year

- Brian Holman: 2023

== Pro Lacrosse Hall of Famers ==
Name	Position	Tenure	Inducted
Ryan Boyle	Attack	2009-2014	2023
Mark Millon	Attack	2005	2022
Kyle Sweeney	Defense	2009-2014	2024

== Season-by-season records ==
Year	W	L	%	Regular season finish	Playoffs
Boston Cannons (MLL)
2001	3	11	.214	2nd in American Division	Lost semifinal 11-12 to Bayhawks
2002	7	7	.500	2nd in American Division	Lost semifinal 10-15 to Bayhawks
2003	7	5	.583	2nd in American Division	Lost semifinal 14-20 to Lizards
2004	8	4	.667	1st in American Division	Won semifinal 24–16 over Bayhawks; Lost championship 11-13 to Barrage
2005	10	2	.883	1st in American Division	Lost semifinal 14-19 to Lizards
2006	8	4	.667	2nd in Eastern Conference	Lost semifinal 12-17 to Barrage
2007	5	7	.417	3rd in Eastern Conference	–
2008	7	5	.583	3rd in Eastern Conference	–
2009	6	6	.500	Tied for 3rd in MLL	Lost semifinal 10-11 to Outlaws
2010	8	4	.667	Tied for 1st in MLL	Lost semifinal 9-13 to Bayhawks
2011	9	3	.750	1st in MLL	Won semifinal 14–13 over Bayhawks; Won championship 10–9 over Nationals
2012	9	5	.643	3rd in MLL	Lost semifinal 10-16 to Bayhawks
2013	5	9	.357	6th in MLL	–
2014	6	8	.529	5th in MLL	–
2015	8	6	.571	4th in MLL	Lost semifinal 15-16 to Lizards
2016	8	6	.571	7th in MLL	–
2017	3	11	.214	9th in MLL	–
2018	5	9	.357	7th in MLL	–
2019	9	7	.563	3rd in MLL	Lost semifinal 15-17 to Outlaws
2020	3	2	.600	4th in MLL	Won championship 13–10 over Outlaws
Cannons Lacrosse Club (PLL)
2021	3	6	.333	7th in PLL	Lost quarterfinals 9-13 to Atlas
2022	1	9	.100	8th in PLL	–
2023	7	3	.700	2nd in PLL	Won quarterfinals 20-11 over Atlas; Lost semifinals 6-17 to Waterdogs
Boston Cannons (PLL)
2024	7	3	.700	2nd in Eastern Conference	Lost quarterfinals 4–8 to Chaos
2025	4	6	.400	4th in Eastern Conference	–
2026	7	5	.583	2nd in Eastern Conference	Won quarterfinals 9-7 over Whipsnakes; Lost semifinals 10-13 to Waterdogs
Totals	163	153	.516		Total playoff record 6–15 (.286 win pct.)

== Draft history ==
=== First round selections (MLL Collegiate Draft) ===
- 2001: None
- 2002: Steve Dusseau, Georgetown (2nd overall); Conor Gill, Virginia (3rd overall)
- 2003: Chris Fiore, UMass (3rd overall)
- 2004: Chris Passavia, Maryland (6th overall)
- 2005: Johnny Christmas, Virginia (5th overall)
- 2006: None
- 2007: Kip Turner, Virginia (2nd overall)
- 2008: Paul Rabil, Johns Hopkins (1st overall)
- 2009: Brandon Corp, Colgate (4th overall)
- 2010: Max Quinzani, Duke (3rd overall)
- 2011: Shamel Bratton, Virginia (6th overall)
- 2012: None
- 2013: Cam Flint, Denver (6th overall)
- 2014: Scott McWilliams, Virginia (8th overall)
- 2015: Ryan Tucker, Virginia (4th overall); John Glesener, Army
- 2016: Greg Coholan, Virginia (6th overall), Brandon Mullins, Syracuse (9th overall)
- 2017: Sergio Perkovic, Notre Dame (2nd overall)
- 2018: Trevor Baptiste, Denver (1st overall)
- 2019: Zach Goodrich, Towson (3rd overall)
- 2020: Nick Mellen, Syracuse (4th overall)

=== PLL Entry Draft ===
- 2021

Rnd.	Pick #	Player	Pos.	Previous MLL Team
1	1	Lyle Thompson	Attack	Chesapeake Bayhawks
1	6	Zach Goodrich	Defensive Midfield	Boston Cannons
3	17	Nick Marrocco	Goalie	Boston Cannons

=== College Draft ===
- 2021

Rnd.	Pick #	Player	Pos.	College
2	9	Jack Kielty	Attack	Notre Dame
4	25	Stephen Rehfuss	Midfield	Syracuse

- 2022

Rnd.	Pick #	Player	Pos.	College
2	10	Asher Nolting	Attack	High Point
2	11	Bubba Fairman	Defensive Midfield	Maryland
3	23	Bryan McIntosh	Defense	Hofstra
3	24	Colin Kirst	Goalie	Rutgers

- 2023

Rnd.	Pick #	Player	Pos.	College
2	9	Matt Campbell	Midfield	Villanova
4	25	Grant Ammann	Defense	High Point

- 2024

Rnd.	Pick #	Player	Pos.	College
1	6	Pat Kavanagh	Attack	Notre Dame
2	14	Alexander Vardaro	Midfield	Georgetown
4	30	Scott Smith	Defense	Johns Hopkins

- 2025

Rnd.	Pick #	Player	Pos.	College
1	4	Coulter Mackesy	Attack	Princeton
2	12	Mic Kelly	Midfield	Denver
4	28	Ben Ramsey	Defensive Midfield	Notre Dame

- 2026

Rnd.	Pick #	Player	Pos.	College
1	2	Mikey Weisshaar	Midfield	Towson
2	10	Hunter Smith	Defense	Richmond
2	15	Will Donovan	LSM	Notre Dame
3	18	Logan Ip	Midfield	Harvard
3	20	Jack Regnery	Midfield	Tufts

== Community involvement ==
The Cannons often reach out to the local community, hosting a variety of lacrosse camps and events for local youth. In addition, the Cannons support MetroLacrosse, by arranging scholarships for MetroLacrosse players and donating tickets for each home game to MetroLacrosse players and families. MetroLacrosse also maintains a booth in the Fan Zone for each home game.
