= MLL Draft =

MLL Draft could mean:

- MLL Collegiate Draft
- MLL Supplemental Draft
