= Thomas Michaelsen =

American lacrosse player

Thomas John Michaelsen
Personal information
- Nickname: Meat
- Born: September 14, 1985 (age 40) Bethpage, New York, U.S.
- Height: 6 ft 2 in (188 cm)
- Weight: 235 lb (107 kg; 16 st 11 lb)

Sport
- Position: Attackman
- Shoots: Right
- NLL draft: 24th overall, 2008; Minnesota Swarm
- NLL teams: Minnesota Swarm
- MLL teams: San Francisco Dragons New York Lizards
- Pro career: 2008–2009

Thomas Michaelsen (born September 14, 1985) is the first lacrosse player ever to be drafted professionally in Major League Lacrosse and the National Lacrosse League from St. John's University. Thomas is currently the President and Founder of 365Lax Inc., a lacrosse company based in Long Island that provides lacrosse-specific services for players in grades kindergarten through twelfth grade.

== Early life ==
Michaelsen was born and raised in Bethpage, New York on Long Island. He grew up with two older sisters, a twin brother Trevor who also played with him at St. John's University and a younger brother. In high school, Michaelsen was named All-County in soccer, wrestling and lacrosse, and also earned All-American in lacrosse. Michaelsen is considered one of the best athletes of all time in Bethpage history and Top 5 Lacrosse players all time from Bethpage.

== Lacrosse career ==
=== Collegiate lacrosse ===
Immediately attending St. John's University on a full scholarship, Michaelsen played and starred in every game and led the team in points ever since. In his senior season, he was named a National Strength and Conditioning Association (NSCA) All-American, earned the Francis A. McCall Memorial Award as the team MVP and also became the fifth player in St. John's history to reach 100 career points and first player since the reinstatement in 2004 to surpass 100 point. In his collegiate career, Michaelsen tallied 71 goals and 46 assists for 117 points, making him fourth in career assists, fifth on the all-time leading scorer list and tied for fifth in career goals in the St. John's record books. As a sophomore in 2006, he earned the team's offensive MVP award. Michaelsen was the first player to earn All-ECAC honors in 2007, and in May became the first player since 1990 to be selected to play in the annual USILA Senior North/South All-Star Game.

=== Professional lacrosse ===
After college, Michaelsen was drafted 42nd overall in the 2008 Major League Lacrosse Collegiate Draft by the San Francisco Dragons and 24th overall in the National Lacrosse League Entry Draft by the Minnesota Swarm. Michaelsen ended his professional career after playing with the NY Lizards in the MLL and as a member of the Swarm in 2009.

=== Business endeavors ===
Tom Michaelsen is an entrepreneur who owns several businesses. He is the founder of 365Lax Inc, a company that provides lacrosse-specific services all year round for both boys and girls in grades 12 and under. and is also the co-founder of College Bound Laxers (CB Laxers) which has helped over 600 athletes to play lacrosse at the collegiate level. Michaelsen is also the co-founder of the US Academy of Lacrosse, a sports complex located in Farmingdale, New York
