= Corp =

Corp may refer to:

== Surname ==
- Aaron Corp (born 1989), American football quarterback
- Brandon Corp (born 1987), American lacrosse player
- Ronald Corp (1951–2025), English composer, conductor and Church of England priest

== Abbreviation ==
- Corp., an abbreviation of corporation
- Corp., an abbreviation of the rank (or informal form of address) of corporal (but more usually "Cpl.")
- Students of Georgetown, Inc., commonly called The Corp, a non-profit charitable organization at Georgetown University in Washington, D.C.
- Corporation (nightclub), Sheffield, England, referred to as "Corp" by locals

== Acronym ==
- Central Oregon and Pacific Railroad (CORP), an American Class II railroad
- Regional Workers' Center of Paraguay (CORP), a Paraguayan trade union federation
- co-RP, a complexity class of computational complexity theory closely related to RP (complexity)

== See also ==
- Corps (disambiguation)
