= Matt Poskay =

American lacrosse player

Personal information
- Nationality: American
- Born: January 13, 1984 (age 42) Clark, New Jersey, U.S.
- Height: 6 ft 0 in (183 cm)
- Weight: 204 lb (93 kg; 14 st 8 lb)
- Website: Matt Poskay

Sport
- Position: Attackman
- NCAA team: Virginia (2006)
- MLL draft: 12th overall, 2006; Boston Cannons
- MLL teams: Boston Cannons; New York Lizards
- Pro career: 2006–2015

Matt Poskay (born January 13, 1984) is an American professional lacrosse player who played with the Boston Cannons and New York Lizards of Major League Lacrosse (MLL). Poskay attended Arthur L. Johnson High School (Clark, New Jersey), where he set a national high school record for goals scored in his career. He played his collegiate lacrosse at the University of Virginia, where he won collegiate national titles in both 2003 and 2006. He was part of the MLL championship team in 2011 with the Cannons.

Poskay scored 468 points during his high school career, a New Jersey state record that stood was broken by Canyon Birch, who graduated from Manasquan High School in 2019 with 558 points. His 362 goals at Arthur L. Johnson High School set a national high school record, which he first broke during his junior year in 2001. He held the national career record for goals scored during his high school career for nearly a decade (a record since surpassed and held as of 2015 by Zed Williams, with 444 career goals), and ranked tied for fifth nationally in career goals as of 2015.

In addition to lacrosse, Poskay played quarterback on his high school's football team, earning first team all-state honors as a senior, and started at point guard for the school's basketball team.

While at the University of Virginia, he was recognized twice as an All-American and was part of the school's Division I NCAA Men's Lacrosse Championship teams in 2003, as well as the team that won the 2006 championship with a 17–0 season record that made them the 12th undefeated champion in Division I history.

Poskay took over the Head Coaching position at Montclair State University in fall 2018. Prior to Montclair, Poskay was the Men's Lacrosse Head Coach at Wagner College since 2011, prior to which he served as an assistant coach at Arthur L. Johnson High School and for two years as an assistant coach at Drew University.

He was inducted into the New Jersey Lacrosse Hall of Fame in 2013, at the age of 29.

== MLL career ==
Poskay was selected in the second round by the Boston Cannons, the 12th pick overall, in the 2006 Major League Lacrosse Collegiate Draft.

During his rookie season in 2006, Poskay led the Cannons with 25 goals in eight games, leading the team in goals and setting a team rookie record. In 2007, he scored 21 goals, earning a spot as an all-star and was named the MLL All-Star Game MVP with a four-goal performance. He was an all-star again in 2008, leading the team with 34 goals. Poskay was recognized as winner of the Major League Lacrosse MVP Award and the Major League Lacrosse Offensive Player of the Year Award in 2010, a season in which he scored a team-record 45 goals. In the 2011 season, Poskay's 30 goals tied for the most in MLL, in a season in which the Cannons won the league championship. In 2012, Poskay led the Cannons with 38 goals.

Season	Team	Regular season											Playoffs										
Season	Team	GP	G	2PG	A	Pts	Sh	GB	Pen	PIM	FOW	FOA	GP	G	2PG	A	Pts	Sh	GB	Pen	PIM	FOW	FOA
2006	Boston Cannons	8	25	0	1	26	56	8	0	1.5	0	0	1	3	0	0	3	6	1	0	1	0	0
2007	Boston Cannons	12	21	0	2	23	70	11	0	6	0	0	–	–	–	–	–	–	–	–	–	–	–
2008	Boston Cannons	12	34	0	7	41	96	21	0	4.5	0	0	–	–	–	–	–	–	–	–	–	–	–
2009	Boston Cannons	7	15	0	3	18	40	3	0	0	0	0	1	0	0	0	0	5	0	0	0	0	0
2010	Boston Cannons	12	45	1	6	52	98	12	0	1	0	0	1	2	0	0	2	6	3	0	5	0	0
2011	Boston Cannons	12	30	0	7	37	77	11	0	3	0	0	2	4	0	0	4	10	1	0	1	0	0
2012	Boston Cannons	13	38	0	3	41	105	16	0	7	0	0	1	1	0	1	2	6	0	0	0	0	0
2013	Boston Cannons	13	27	0	2	29	78	13	0	5	0	0	–	–	–	–	–	–	–	–	–	–	–
2015	New York Lizards	7	9	0	0	9	26	1	0	1	0	0	–	–	–	–	–	–	–	–	–	–	–
		96	244	1	31	276	646	96	0	29	0	0	6	10	0	1	11	23	5	0	7	0	0
Career total:		102	254	1	32	287	669	101	0	36	0	0											

GP–Games played; G–Goals; 2PG–2-point goals; A–Assists; Pts–Points; Sh–Shots; GB–Ground balls; Pen–Penalties; PIM–Penalty minutes; FOW–Faceoffs won; FOA–Faceoffs attempted
