= Scott Hiller =

Lacrosse coach and player

Scott Hiller is a former owner of the Washington Bayhawks. He was the head coach of the Major League Lacrosse's Washington Bayhawks for 2 seasons, and the Boston Cannons for 4 seasons, where he won two coach of the year awards. During his four-year tenure with the Cannons, Hiller compiled a 32–18 regular season record. Hiller began his coaching career as an assistant lacrosse coach at Harvard University from 1991 to 1999.

A 1990 graduate of the University of Massachusetts Amherst, Hiller was a four-time All-America selection for the Minutemen. He was also a member of the United States men's national lacrosse team at the 1994 World Lacrosse Championship, where he won the gold medal. He also serves as a volunteer Assistant Coach for the Northwestern University women's lacrosse team. In addition to his lacrosse experience, Hiller is licensed to practice law in Massachusetts and Illinois, and received his JD from Suffolk University. On September 10, 2016, Hiller was inducted into the UMass Athletic Hall Of Fame.

== Awards ==
Preceded by John DeTommaso	Major League Lacrosse Coach of the Year Award; 2002	Succeeded by Ted Georgalas
Preceded by Sal LoCascio	Major League Lacrosse Coach of the Year Award; 2005	Succeeded by Tony Resch
