= Pat Heim =

American lacrosse player

Personal information
- Nationality: American
- Born: May 25, 1984 (age 42) Wayne, Pennsylvania, U.S.
- Height: 5 ft 11 in (180 cm)
- Weight: 205 lb (93 kg; 14 st 9 lb)

Sport
- Position: Midfield
- NLL teams: Philadelphia Wings
- MLL team Former teams: Washington Bayhawks; Chicago Machine
- Former NCAA team: Penn State University
- Pro career: 2007–2013

Patrick Pat Heim (born May 25, 1984) is a former professional lacrosse player who played for the Boston Cannons in Major League Lacrosse and the Philadelphia Wings in the National Lacrosse League.

== High school career ==
Heim was born May 25, 1984, in Wayne, Pennsylvania. He attended Conestoga High School in Berwyn, Pennsylvania, where he played football, wrestling, and lacrosse. In his senior year at Conestoga, Heim was ranked the #1 wrestler at 189 lbs in southeastern Pennsylvania.

== College career ==
Heim attended Pennsylvania State University, where he was named to the All-ECAC First Team three times during his Nittany Lion career.

== Professional career ==
Heim was the 2007 Major League Lacrosse first overall collegiate draft choice by the Chicago Machine. Heim made an immediate impact and won MLL Rookie of the Week honors for his performance in his first professional game.

Heim went undrafted in the National Lacrosse League entry draft, and was signed as a free agent by Philadelphia Wings. A Philadelphia area native, he made Wings team and scored in his first game of the 2008 NLL season.

Heim ended his playing career following the 2013 NLL season.

== Statistics ==
=== MLL ===
		Regular Season							Playoffs
Season	Team	GP	G	2ptG	A	Pts	LB	PIM	GP	G	2ptG	A	Pts	LB	PIM
2007	Chicago	11	14	1	9	26	12	2.5	--	--	--	--	--	--	--
2008	Chicago	12	12	0	3	15	19	0.5	--	--	--	--	--	--	--
MLL Totals		23	26	1	12	39	31	3	0	0	0	0	0	0	0

=== NLL ===
		Regular Season						Playoffs
Season	Team	GP	G	A	Pts	LB	PIM	GP	G	A	Pts	LB	PIM
2008	Philadelphia	16	5	8	13	46	4	1	0	0	0	0	0
2009	Philadelphia	13	3	4	7	44	4	--	--	--	--	--	--
NLL totals		29	8	12	20	90	8	1	0	0	0	0	0

=== Penn State University ===
Season	GP	G	A	Pts	PPG	GB
2004	13	5	7	12	0.93	17
2005	15	22	11	33	2.20	24
2006	13	17	5	22	1.69	28
2007	13	14	4	18	1.39	24
Totals	54	58	27	93	1.57	93

== See also ==
- Lacrosse in Pennsylvania
