= Marcus Holman =

American lacrosse player

Personal information
- Nationality: American
- Born: May 2, 1991 (age 35) Baltimore, Maryland, U.S.
- Height: 5 ft 10 in (178 cm)
- Weight: 180 lb (82 kg; 12 st 12 lb)

Sport
- Position: Attack
- Shoots: Right
- NCAA team: North Carolina (2013)
- MLL draft: 12th overall, 2013; Ohio Machine
- MLL teams: Ohio Machine
- PLL team Former teams: Cannons LC; Archers LC
- Pro career: 2013–

Career highlights
- MLL: 5x All-Star (2014, 2015, 2016, 2017, 2018); 1x First Team All-Pro (2017); 1x Champion (2017); 1x Championship Game MVP (2017); PLL: Eamon McEneaney Attackman of the Year (2023); 5x All-Star (2019, 2021, 2022, 2023, 2024); 3x First Team All-Pro (2019, 2023, 2026); Second Team All-Pro (2024); 2x PLL Accuracy Champion (2019, 2021); 1x PLL Leading Scorer (2019); 2x PLL Championship Series Champion (2024, 2025); 2x All-Star Game MVP (2022, 2024); 1x ASG Accuracy Challenge Champion (2024); NCAA: 3x All-American (2011, 2012, 2013); ACC Freshman of the Year (2010); 2x ACC Player of the Year Nominee (2012, 2013); 1x ACC Player of the Year Finalist (2013)
Medal record
Representing United States
Men's lacrosse
World Lacrosse Championship
Winner	2018 Netanya
Runner-up	2014 Denver
World Lacrosse Box Championships
Bronze medal – third place	2015 Onondaga

Marcus Holman (born May 2, 1991) is an American professional lacrosse player for Boston Cannons of the Premier Lacrosse League and an assistant coach for the Utah Utes men's lacrosse team. Holman was an attackman for the University of North Carolina Tar Heels. He was UNC's all-time leading scorer until Joey Sankey surpassed him during the 2015 season.

Holman's father, Brian, coached UNC's goalkeepers and helps coordinate the defense. He joined head coach Joe Breschi in his first year at Chapel Hill in 2009. More recently, Brian Holman took over as head coach of lacrosse at University of Utah. Marcus' older brother, Matthew, was a goalkeeper for the Tar Heels in 2011 and 2012. His mother is the Director of Operations for the North Carolina Tar Heels women's lacrosse team, which his sister Sydney has played for since 2014 lacrosse season.

== Early years ==
Holman attended Gilman School in Baltimore and the lacrosse team he played on was ranked No. 1 by Inside Lacrosse in 2009 in Holman's senior year, when he was the team's MVP and captain. He was also a captain of his high school football team in his freshman year.

== College career ==
In Holman's freshman year, he won the ACC Freshman of the Year award in 2010. He switched from attack to midfield as a sophomore. His teammates voted him UNC's most valuable player in 2011 and 2012. He was also a second-team All-American in 2012. He was named to the 2013 All-ACC team by the ACC coaches on 24 April 2013. The 2013 season was Holman's second consecutive year on the All-ACC team. Holman became the Tar Heels' all-time leading scorer on 28 April 2013 when he surpassed the previous school record of 204 set by Bruce Ledwith (1970–73).

=== College statistics (North Carolina) ===
Year	Player	GP/GS	Goals	Assists	Points	Ground Balls/game
2013	Holman Sr.	15/15	37	43	80	1.5
2012	Holman Jr.	17/17	39	35	74	1.6
2011	Holman, So.	14/12	23	5	28	0.6
2010	Holman, Fr.	16/8	22	9	31	1.8

Four ACC Men Named as Tewaaraton Nominees

== Tewaaraton Award ==
Holman was a nominee for the Tewaaraton Award in 2012 and 2013. There were 13 other attackmen on the nominee list in 2013, including the winner from the previous year, attackman Peter Baum from Colgate, and a repeat finalist, Mike Sawyer, an attackman from Loyola University.

== Major League Lacrosse ==
The Ohio Machine selected Holman in the second round of the Major League Lacrosse draft.

Holman played 6 seasons with the Machine and 81 games. He was the 2017 MLL Championship MVP scoring 4 goals with 2 assists leading the Machine to their 1st MLL Championship. He finished his MLL Career with 208 Goals (12th All Time), 87 assists, and 302 total points (16th All Time.)

=== MLL statistics ===
Season	Team	Regular season											Playoffs										
Season	Team	GP	G	2PG	A	Pts	Sh	GB	Pen	PIM	FOW	FOA	GP	G	2PG	A	Pts	Sh	GB	Pen	PIM	FOW	FOA
2013	Machine	10	7	2	11	20	42	11	0	0	0	0	–	–	–	–	–	–	–	–	–	–	–
2014	Machine	13	37	3	10	50	71	26	0	1	0	0	1	2	0	0	2	10	2	0	0	0	0
2015	Machine	14	39	0	11	50	101	18	0	1	0	0	1	3	0	0	3	7	0	0	0	0	0
2016	Machine	14	42	0	16	58	116	33	0	1	0	0	2	7	0	4	11	17	4	0	0	0	0
2017	Machine	12	34	0	15	49	98	22	0	4	0	0	2	6	0	5	11	15	4	0	0	0	0
2018	Machine	12	31	2	15	48	95	25	0	3	0	0	–	–	–	–	–	–	–	–	–	–	–
		75	190	7	78	275	523	135	0	10	0	0	6	18	0	9	27	49	10	0	0	0	0
Career total:		81	208	7	87	302	572	145	0	10	0	0											

GP–Games played; G–Goals; 2PG–2-point goals; A–Assists; Pts–Points; Sh–Shots; GB–Ground balls; Pen–Penalties; PIM–Penalty minutes; FOW–Faceoffs won; FOA–Faceoffs attempted

== Premier Lacrosse League ==
In 2019, Holman joined the Archers Lacrosse Club of Paul Rabil’s new league called the Premier Lacrosse League. He was selected to the 2019 PLL All-Star Game, playing for Team Baptiste.

Holman signed as a free agent with Cannons Lacrosse Club ahead of the 2023 season. He was named as co-captain ahead of the season.

Holman is represented by Athelo Group, a sports agency based out of Norwalk, Connecticut.

=== PLL statistics ===
Season	Team	Regular season											Playoffs										
Season	Team	GP	G	2PG	A	Pts	Sh	GB	Pen	PIM	FOW	FOA	GP	G	2PG	A	Pts	Sh	GB	Pen	PIM	FOW	FOA
2019	Archers	10	21	2	7	30	74	17	0	2	0	0	3	10	0	1	11	33	5	0	0	0	0
2020	Archers	6	6	0	1	7	26	14	2	1	0	0	–	–	–	–	–	–	–	–	–	–	–
2021	Archers	9	16	0	8	24	50	24	1	1	0	0	1	1	0	0	1	5	3	0	0	0	0
2022	Archers	10	19	2	8	29	55	22	1	0.5	0	0	2	5	0	0	5	11	3	0	0	0	0
2023	Cannons	10	30	1	13	44	79	24	1	0.5	0	0	2	2	0	2	4	11	7	0	0	0	0
2024	Cannons	10	25	3	4	32	77	24	2	1	0	0	1	0	0	0	0	3	1	0	0	0	0
2025	Cannons	10	14	5	5	24	55	24	2	1.5	0	0	–	–	–	–	–	–	–	–	–	–	–
2026	Cannons	12	28	6	7	41	81	18	4	3.5	0	0	2	2	0	1	3	14	7	0	0	0	0
		77	159	19	53	231	497	167	13	11	0	0	11	20	0	4	24	74	26	0	0	0	0
Career total:		88	179	19	57	255	571	193	13	11	0	0											

GP–Games played; G–Goals; 2PG–2-point goals; A–Assists; Pts–Points; Sh–Shots; GB–Ground balls; Pen–Penalties; PIM–Penalty minutes; FOW–Faceoffs won; FOA–Faceoffs attempted

== Personal life ==
Holman married fellow professional lacrosse player Alex Aust on December 17, 2021 in Tulum, Mexico.
