= Dan Glading =

American lacrosse player (born 1986)

Personal information
- Nationality: American
- Born: December 17, 1986 (age 39) Bethesda, Maryland, U.S.
- Height: 6 ft 2 in (188 cm)
- Weight: 110 lb (50 kg; 7 st 12 lb)

Sport
- Position: Attack
- MLL team: Chesapeake Bayhawks
- NCAA team: University of Virginia

Dan Glading (born December 17, 1986, in Bethesda, Maryland) is a lacrosse player, nicknamed Danny Glading who played at the University of Virginia and currently plays in Major League Lacrosse for the Chesapeake Bayhawks.

Danny Glading played in high school for Georgetown Prep, a school regularly nationally ranked in lacrosse. Glading played attack for the Virginia Cavaliers from 2006 to 2009, leading the team to an NCAA Championship in 2006. He was named an All-American three times by the USILA and was a finalist for the 2009 Tewaaraton Trophy, given annually to the nation's best lacrosse player. Glading finished his career ranked in Virginia's top ten in goals (seventh), assists (tied for fifth), and points (tied for fifth). His career totals of 119 goals and 104 assists make him only the sixth player in Atlantic Coast Conference history to reach 100 goals and 100 assists in a career.

The Washington Bayhawks selected Glading with the fifth overall pick of the 2009 Major League Lacrosse draft.

== Statistics ==
=== University of Virginia ===
Season	GP	G	A	Pts	PPG
2006	17	26	21	47	--
2007	16	31	17	48	--
2008	18	30	35	65	--
2009	18	32	31	63	--
Totals	69	119	104	223	--

=== Major League Lacrosse ===
		Regular Season							Playoffs
Season	Team	GP	G	2ptG	A	Pts	LB	PIM	GP	G	2ptG	A	Pts	LB	PIM
2009	Washington	8	4	0	11	15	8	0	--	--	--	--	--	--	--
MLL Totals		8	4	0	11	15	8	0	--	--	--	--	--	--	--
