= 2005 Major League Lacrosse collegiate draft =

2005 Collegiate Draft of Major League Lacrosse

	# Overall	Team	Player	College
Round 1	1	New Jersey	Kyle Harrison	Johns Hopkins
Round 1	2	Philadelphia (from Long Island)	Jed Prossner	North Carolina
Round 1	3	Baltimore	Brodie Merrill	Georgetown
Round 1	4	Baltimore (from Philadelphia through Boston)	Benson Erwin	Johns Hopkins
Round 1	5	Boston (from Rochester)	Johnny Christmas	Virginia
Round 1	6	New Jersey (from Boston)	Andy Corno	Georgetown
Round 2	7	New Jersey	Graham Gill	Navy
Round 2	8	Philadelphia (from Long Island)	Kyle Barrie	Johns Hopkins
Round 2	9	New Jersey (from Baltimore)	Jay Pfeifer	Syracuse
Round 2	10	Philadelphia	Justin Redd	Cornell
Round 2	11	Rochester	Jason Doneger	Princeton
Round 2	12	Boston	Tom Garvey	Johns Hopkins
Round 3	13	New Jersey	Ben Grinnell	Dartmouth
Round 3	14	Long Island	Chris Cara	Bucknell
Round 3	15	Baltimore	Matt Rewkowski	Johns Hopkins
Round 3	16	Rochester (from Philadelphia)	Justin Smith	Salisbury
Round 3	17	Rochester	Scott Ditzell	Syracuse
Round 3	18	Boston	Jarett Park	Syracuse
Round 4	19	Long Island	Chazz Woodson	Brown
Round 4	20	Baltimore	William Cutler	Penn State
Round 4	21	Philadelphia	Jeff Bigas	Salisbury
Round 4	22	New Jersey (from Rochester through Boston)	Rob Bateman	Virginia
Round 4	23	Boston	Brian Giordano	Notre Dame
Round 4	24	New Jersey	Kyle Georgalas	Cornell
Round 5	25	Long Island	Jack deVilliers	Virginia
Round 5	26	Boston (from Baltimore)	Chris Mucciolo	Brown
Round 5	27	Philadelphia	Ryan Vilar	Hofstra
Round 5	28	Rochester	James Wagner	Army
Round 5	29	Boston	Andrew Goldstein	Dartmouth
