= 2008 Boston Cannons season =

Major League Lacrosse team season

- Head coach: Bill Daye
- Home stadium: Harvard Stadium

Results
- Record: 7-5
- Conference place: 3rd
- Playoffs: Did not qualify

This is the 8th season that the Eastern Conference team called the Boston Cannons play in their home games at Harvard Stadium. They were selected on host the 8th annual Major League Lacrosse Steinfeld Cup championship weekend at Harvard Stadium on August 23 to August 24. The opening game of the season is at home against New Jersey Pride.

== Standings ==
W = Wins, L = Losses, PCT = Winning Percentage, GF = Goals For, GA Goals Against

Eastern Conference
Team	W	L	PCT	GF	GA
Rochester Rattlers	9	3	.600	75	63
Philadelphia Barrage	7	5	.600	77	72
Boston Cannons	7	5	.600	69	71
New Jersey Pride	6	6	.600	67	76
Long Island Lizards	5	7	.500	60	53
Washington Bayhawks	4	8	.250	44	60

=Qualified for championship weekend

== Regular season schedule ==
Week	Date	Opponent	Home/Away	Result
1	May 17	New Jersey Pride	Home	13–9
2	May 23	Rochester Rattlers	Home	14–17
3	May 31	Long Island Lizards	Away	19–20
4	June 6	New Jersey Pride	Away	17–8
5	June 19	Washington Bayhawks	Home	14–12
6	June 28	San Francisco Dragons	Away	14–21
7	July 3	Philadelphia Barrage	Home	
8	July 12	Long Island Lizards	Home	
9	July 19	Washington Bayhawks	Away	
10	July 26	Rochester Rattlers	Away	
11	August 2	Philadelphia Barrage	Home	
12	August 9	Denver Outlaws	Home	
