= 2004 Major League Lacrosse collegiate draft =

2004 Collegiate Draft of Major League Lacrosse

Michael Powell was selected with the first overall pick by the Baltimore Bayhawks.

	# Overall	Team	Player	Position	College
Round 1	1	Baltimore (from Philadelphia)	Michael Powell	Attackman	Syracuse
Round 1	2	Rochester	Ryan Boyle	Attackman	Princeton
Round 1	3	Philadelphia (from Boston)	Tillman Johnson	Goalkeeper	Virginia
Round 1	4	Rochester (from New Jersey)	Sean Lindsay	Midfielder	Syracuse
Round 1	5	Baltimore	Lee Zink	Defenseman	Maryland
Round 1	6	Boston (from Long Island)	Chris Passavia	Defenseman	Maryland
Round 2	7	Philadelphia	Conor Ford	Attackman	Johns Hopkins
Round 2	8	New Jersey (from Rochester)	Walid Hajj	Midfielder	Georgetown
Round 2	9	Boston	Ronnie Staines	Defenseman	North Carolina
Round 2	10	Philadelphia (from Boston)	Ben DeFelice	Midfielder	Towson
Round 2	11	Baltimore	Mike Levin	Goalkeeper	Brown
Round 2	12	Boston (from Long Island)	Kevin Frew	Midfielder	North Carolina
Round 3	13	Philadelphia	Steve Vallone	Midfielder	Syracuse
Round 3	14	Rochester	Tony Russo	Goalkeeper	Ohio State
Round 3	15	Boston	Jeff Bryan	Attackman	Army
Round 3	16	Rochester (from New Jersey)	Kevin Dougherty	Midfielder	Syracuse
Round 3	17	Baltimore	Kevin Boland	Midfielder	Johns Hopkins
Round 3	18	Long Island	Corey Harned	Defenseman	Johns Hopkins
Round 4	19	Philadelphia	Greg Bice	Defenseman	Ohio State
Round 4	20	Rochester	Eric Martin	Defenseman	Salisbury
Round 4	21	Boston	Brian Nee	Attackman	Syracuse
Round 4	22	New Jersey	Peter Vlahakis	Midfielder	Fairfield
Round 4	23	Baltimore	Matt Alrich	Attackman	Delaware
Round 4	24	Long Island	Andrew Murray	Midfielder	Salisbury
Round 5	25	Philadelphia	Andrew Roth	Midfielder	Cortland
Round 5	26	Rochester	Brian Joy	Midfielder	Hobart
Round 5	27	Boston	Drew Pfarr	Midfielder	Towson
Round 5	28	New Jersey	Tom Daniels	Midfielder	Dartmouth
Round 5	29	Baltimore	Blaise Fletcher	Defenseman	Bucknell
Round 5	30	Long Island	Steve Berger	Midfielder	Washington College
