= Casey Cittadino =

Personal information
- Nationality: Israeli
- Born: December 13, 1982 (age 43) Baldwin, New York, United States
- Height: 5 ft 10 in (178 cm)
- Weight: 185 lb (84 kg; 13 st 3 lb)

Sport
- Position: Midfield
- NLL draft: 64th overall, 2006; Colorado Mammoth
- MLL team: Denver Outlaws
- NCAA team: Towson University
- Pro career: 2006–

Casey Cittadino is a consultant specializing in sales, marketing, and business development in addition to being a lacrosse player who played in the United States with the Denver Outlaws of Major League Lacrosse.

== College career ==
Cittadino attended Towson University where he received honorable mention All-American his senior year.

- Named to the All-Time Towson Team (top 50 players in school history)
- 2nd all-time in Towson history for caused turnovers
- Two-time team captain: 2004–2006 seasons under head coach Tony Seaman
- Jack Heart Unsung Hero award; a prestigious award given to a single male athlete in honor of Jack Heart for selfless devotion to one's teammates and coaching staff
- 2005 Honorable Mention All-American
- Joseph Ferrante Scholar
