= Brandon Corp =

American lacrosse player

Personal information
- Nickname: The Corporation
- Nationality: American
- Born: March 2, 1987 (age 38) Norfolk, Virginia, U.S.
- Height: 6 ft 0 in (183 cm)
- Weight: 180 lb (82 kg; 12 st 12 lb)

Sport
- Position: Attack
- Shoots: Right
- NLL draft: 57th overall, 2009; Rochester Knighthawks
- MLL team: Boston Cannons

Brandon Corp (born March 2, 1987) was a lacrosse player for Colgate University in Division I college lacrosse and the Boston Cannons of Major League Lacrosse. Corp played for the Raiders from 2006 to 2009 leading the team to a 42 and 20 record during his four years, ending up as the 4th leading scorer in the nation his senior season, and leading the team to a Patriot League title and an NCAA tournament appearance as a junior. He was the Patriot League Offensive Player of the year for three years in a row from his sophomore year to senior year. The Boston Cannons selected Corp with the fourth pick of the 2009 MLL draft. Corp finished the '09 season with 8 goals and 3 assists for 11 points in 7 games.

Corp was born in Norfolk, Virginia. He played high school lacrosse for Chittenango High School in Chittenango, New York, serving as team captain his Junior and Senior years and receiving All-American honors his senior year of high school. He's the leading scorer in Chittenango lacrosse and basketball history and also lettered in football in high school. He was named player of the year husband junior year.

== Statistics ==
=== Colgate University ===
| Season | GP | G | A | Pts | PPG |
|---|---|---|---|---|---|
| 2006 | 15 | 19 | 6 | 25 | -- |
| 2007 | 16 | 32 | 18 | 50 | -- |
| 2008 | 17 | 41 | 16 | 57 | -- |
| 2009 | 14 | 35 | 27 | 62 | -- |
| Totals | 62 | 117 | 67 | 184 | -- |

=== Major League Lacrosse ===
| | | Regular Season | | | | | | | Playoffs |
| Season | Team | GP | G | 2ptG | A | Pts | LB | PIM | GP | G | 2ptG | A | Pts | LB | PIM |
|---|---|---|---|---|---|---|---|---|---|---|---|---|---|---|---|
| 2009 | Boston | 7 | 8 | 0 | 3 | 11 | 9 | 0.5 | 1 | 1 | 0 | 0 | 1 | 0 | 0 |
| MLL Totals | | 7 | 8 | 0 | 3 | 11 | 9 | 0.5 | 1 | 1 | 0 | 0 | 1 | 0 | 0 |
