= 2009 Major League Lacrosse collegiate draft =

The 2009 Collegiate Draft of Major League Lacrosse was held on May 27, 2009. Kenny Nims was selected first overall by the Chicago Machine.

	# Overall	Team	Player	Position	College
Round 1	1	Chicago	Kenny Nims	Attackman	Syracuse
Round 1	2	Denver (from Washington)	Max Seibald	Midfield	Cornell
Round 1	3	Long Island	Zack Greer	Attackman	Bryant
Round 1	4	Boston	Brandon Corp	Midfielder	Colgate
Round 1	5	Washington (from Denver)	Dan Glading	Attackman	Virginia
Round 1	6	Toronto	Sid Smith	Defenseman	Syracuse
Round 1	7	Denver (from Boston)	Shane Walterhoefer	Midfielder/Face-off	North Carolina
Round 1	8	Denver	Dan Hardy	Midfielder	Syracuse
Round 1	9	Washington (from Toronto through Boston)	Matt Abbott	Midfielder	Syracuse
Round 2	10	Chicago	John Glynn	Midfielder	Cornell
Round 2	11	Washington	PT Ricci	Defenseman	Loyola
Round 2	12	Long Island	Mark Kovler	Midfielder	Princeton
Round 2	13	Toronto (from Boston)	Doc Schneider	Goalkeeper	Massachusetts
Round 2	14	Denver	Brian Christopher	Midfielder	Johns Hopkins
Round 2	15	Toronto	Brad Ross	Midfielder	Duke
Round 2	16	Boston	Jordan Burke	Goalkeeper	Brown
Round 3	17	Chicago	Ryan Hoff	Attackman	Notre Dame
Round 3	18	Washington	Michael Evans	Defenseman	Johns Hopkins
Round 3	19	Long Island	Drew Adams	Goalkeeper	Penn State
Round 3	20	Boston	Pete Poillon	Midfielder	UMBC
Round 3	21	Denver	Shane Koppens	Attackman	Loyola
Round 3	22	Toronto	Corey Small	Attackman	Albany
Round 3	23	Washington	Jeff Reynolds	Midfielder	Maryland
Round 3	24	Long Island	Regis McDermott	Defenseman	Notre Dame
Round 3	25	Toronto	Mike Timms	Defenseman	Virginia
Round 3	26	Washington	Dan Groot	Midfielder	Maryland
Round 4	27	Chicago	Steven Bauer	Defenseman	Georgetown
Round 4	28	Washington	Ben Hunt	Midfielder	North Carolina
Round 4	29	Long Island	Anthony Muscarella	Midfielder	Hofstra
Round 4	30	Boston	Matt Messina	Midfielder	NYIT
Round 4	31	Denver	Chris O'Dougherty	Defenseman	Rutgers
Round 4	32	Toronto	Garrett Billings	Attackman	Virginia
Round 4	33	Washington	Ryan McFadyen	Defenseman	Duke
Round 4	34	Long Island	Chris Eck	Face-off	Colgate
Round 4	35	Denver	Alex Hopmann	Midfielder	UMBC
Round 4	36	Denver	Jeremy Blevins	Goalkeeper	UMBC
Round 5	37	Chicago	Thomas Kehoe	Midfielder	Gettysburg
Round 5	38	Washington	Kylor Berkman	Midfielder	Salisbury
Round 5	39	Long Island	Donny Moss	Defenseman	Adelphi
Round 5	40	Boston	Jake Beebe	Attackman	Springfield (Ma.)
Round 5	41	Denver	Rocco Romero	Midfielder	Cornell
Round 5	42	Toronto	Chris Schongar	Defenseman	Albany
