= 2014 Major League Lacrosse draft =

General information
- Sport: Lacrosse
- Date: January 10, 2014
- Location: Philadelphia Marriott; Philadelphia, PA
- Network: YouTube

Overview
- League: Major League Lacrosse
- First selection: Tom Schreiber, Ohio Machine

The 2014 Major League Lacrosse draft took place on January 10, 2014 in Philadelphia, Pennsylvania.

== Draft ==
=== Round 1 ===
Overall	Team	Player	Positions	College
1	Ohio Machine	Tom Schrieber	M	Princeton
2	Rochester Rattlers	Jordan Wolf	A	Duke
3	New York Lizards	Joe Fletcher	D	Loyola
4	New York Lizards	Luke Duprey	D	Duke
5	Florida Launch	Kieran McArdle	A	St. Johns
6	Denver Outlaws	Jeremy Noble	M	Denver
7	Charlotte Hounds	Michael Ehrhardt	D	Maryland
8	Boston Cannons	Scott McWilliams	D	UVA

=== Round 2 ===
Overall	Team	Player	Positions	College
9	Charlotte Hounds	Pat Laconi	M	Loyola
10	Florida Launch	Joe Meurer	D	Ohio State
11	Charlotte Hounds	Mike Chanenchuk	M	Maryland
12	Florida Launch	Ryan Creighton	M	UNC
13	Ohio Machine	Rob Guida	M	Johns Hopkins
14	Charlotte Hounds	Brendan Fowler	FOS	Duke
15	Charlotte Hounds	Thomas DeNapoli	A/M	Towson
16	Denver Outlaws	Brent Hiken	FOS	Stevenson University

=== Round 3 ===
Overall	Team	Player	Positions	College
17	Boston Cannons	Rob Emery	M	UVA
18	Charlotte Hounds	Josh Dionne	A	Duke
19	Boston Cannons	Austin Kaut	G	Penn State
20	Rochester Rattlers	Miles Thompson	A	Albany
21	Chesapeake Bayhawks	Matt Harris	D	Syracuse
22	Denver Outlaws	Ty Souders	D	Lehigh
23	Charlotte Hounds	Justin Ward	A	Loyola
24	Chesapeake Bayhawks	Dylan Levings	FOS	Yale

=== Round 4 ===
Overall	Team	Player	Positions	College
25	Ohio Machine	Jackson Place	D	Bucknell University
26	Rochester Rattlers	John Locascio	M	Villanova
27	Ohio Machine	Scott Loy	M	Syracuse
28	Rochester Rattlers	Ty Thompson	A	Albany
29	Florida Launch	Niko Amato	G	Maryland
30	Denver Outlaws	Colin Dunster	M	Bryant
31	Charlotte Hounds	Henry Lobb	D	Duke
32	Rochester Rattlers	Dan Eipp	M	Harvard

=== Round 5 ===
Overall	Team	Player	Positions	College
33	Boston Cannons	Jack Reilly	D	Johns Hopkins
34	New York Lizards	Brandon Mangan	A	Yale
35	Chesapeake Bayhawks	Pat Kiernan	D	Navy
36	Chesapeake Bayhawks	Alex Love	A	Hobart
37	Boston Cannons	Erik Smith	M	Air Force
38	Denver Outlaws	Jamie Faus	G	Denver
39	Ohio Machine	Derek Maltz	A	Syracuse
40	Chesapeake Bayhawks	Brandon Benn	A	Johns Hopkins

=== Round 6 ===
Overall	Team	Player	Positions	College
41	Ohio Machine	Steve O'hara	D	Notre Dame
42	Boston Cannons	Phil Castronova	M	Johns Hopkins
43	Denver Outlaws	James Connelly	D	Delaware
44	Rochester Rattlers	Tom Freshour	D	Cornell
45	Florida Launch	Bobby Lawrence	D	Colgate
46	Denver Outlaws	Nick Fernandez	M	Princeton
47	Charlotte Hounds	Zach Losco	M	Penn
48	Chesapeake Bayhawks	Kevin Cernuto	A	St. Johns

=== Round 7 ===
Overall	Team	Player	Positions	College
49	Ohio Machine	RG Keenan	M	UNC
50	Chesapeake Bayhawks	Mark McNeill	M	UNC
51	Boston Cannons	Phil Poe	FOS	UMBC
52	Rochester Rattlers	Andrew Wagne	D	Mercyhurst
53	Florida Launch	Andrew Barton	M	Providence
54	Denver Outlaws	Terry Ellis	M	Denver
55	Charlotte Hounds	Chris Hipps	D	Duke
56	Rochester Rattlers	Mark Cockerton	A	UVA

=== Round 8 ===
Overall	Team	Player	Positions	College
57	Ohio Machine	Spencer Schnell	M	Ohio Wesleyan
58	New York Lizards	Alex Zomerfeld	A	Bryant
59	Boston Cannons	Jack Murphy	G	Fairfield
60	Rochester Rattlers	Tom Lacrosse	M	Penn State
61	Florida Launch	Duncan Clancy	A	Jacksonville
62	Denver Outlaws	Ben Mcintosh	M	Drexel
63	Charlotte Hounds	Kevin O'Neil	M	Villanova
64	Chesapeake Bayhawks	Brian Cooper	D	Maryland

== Abbreviation key ==
- A- Attack
- D- Defense
- FOS- Face-off Specialist
- G- Goalie
- M- Midfield

== See also ==
- Major League Lacrosse draft
