= Corey Harned =

American lacrosse player

Corey Harned (born December 26, 1981) is an American lacrosse player who previously played for the Long Island Lizards and the New Jersey Pride of Major League Lacrosse. He played lacrosse and football at Sachem High School in Lake Ronkonkoma, N.Y. He played in the NCAA for Johns Hopkins University. Harned is the younger brother of Chris Harned, who was an attackman for the Toronto Blue Jays from 1997 to 2000.
