= Kyle Harrison (lacrosse) =

American lacrosse player (born 1983)

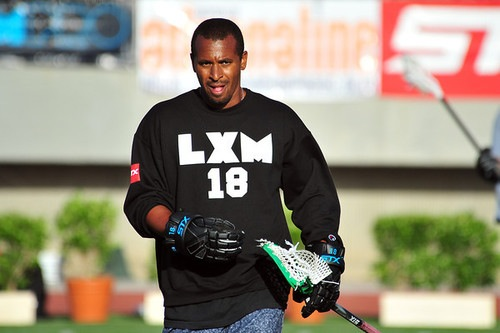
- Harrison, c. 2012

Personal information
- Nickname: K18
- Born: March 12, 1983 (age 43) Baltimore, Maryland, U.S.
- Height: 6 ft 1 in (185 cm)
- Weight: 205 lb (93 kg; 14 st 9 lb)

Sport
- Position: Midfielder
- Shoots: Right
- NCAA team: Johns Hopkins University lacrosse (2005)
- MLL draft: 1st overall, 2005; New Jersey Pride
- MLL teams: New Jersey Pride; Los Angeles Riptide; Denver Outlaws; Ohio Machine
- PLL teams: Redwoods L.C.
- Pro career: 2005–21

Career highlights
- PLL: 2x Brendan Looney Leadership Award; 2x All Star; MLL: 7x All Star; MLL Championship (2017); Ohio Machine Team MVP (2014); NCAA: Johns Hopkins University Athletics Hall of Fame (2016); Tewaaraton Award (2005); Lt. Raymond Enners Award (2005); Undefeated Season (16-0) (2005); 2x McLaughlin Award (2005, 2004); 3x Top 5 Tewaaraton Finalist (2005, 2004, 2003); 2nd-Team All-American (2003); Other: National Lacrosse Hall of Fame (2023); USA Lacrosse Greater Baltimore Chapter Hall of Fame (2016); Baltimore Hall of Fame (2016); Friends School Hall of Fame (2011)
Medal record
Representing United States
Men's lacrosse
World Lacrosse Championship
Runner-up	2006 London
Runner-up	2014 Denver

Kyle Harrison (born March 12, 1983) is an American entrepreneur and retired professional lacrosse player. He now serves as the PLL Director of Player Relations and Diversity Inclusion.

He had a seventeen-year career in professional field lacrosse, and played for the US national lacrosse team twice. As a college lacrosse player at Johns Hopkins University, he played at the two-way midfield position and also took face-offs. He was a team captain on the 2005 team that went undefeated (16–0) to win the NCAA Division I Men's Lacrosse Championship. The same year, he won the Tewaaraton Men's Player of the Year Award. He has been described as "the face of college lacrosse" during that year. As a professional lacrosse player, he was a 9-time all-star, 12-time team captain, and won the 2017 championship.

In late 2009, Kyle Harrison left the Major League Lacrosse (MLL) league to co-found the LXM Pro Tour league, a distinct professional men's field lacrosse league, which was active in 2010 until 2014, when it announced partnership with the MLL. In 2016, Kyle was inducted into the Johns Hopkins University Athletics Hall of Fame, the USA Lacrosse Greater Baltimore Chapter Hall of Fame, and the Baltimore Hall of Fame. He retired from professional lacrosse in 2021, and was inducted into the National Lacrosse Hall of Fame in 2023, and the Professional Lacrosse Hall of Fame in 2025.

He is credited with pioneering the jumpshot, his signature move, which is his lacrosse adaption of the basketball jumpshot. Additionally, he is credited with popularizing the fake-and-split dodge, also known as the hitch-and-split dodge, also a signature move, which originated as a lacrosse adaption of the Allen Iverson crossover. Kyle is widely regarded as one of the greatest lacrosse players of all time. He is also widely considered one of the most successful and decorated lacrosse players of all time. He is renowned for his athleticism, explosiveness, shooting on the run, versatility and leadership.

Harrison has also been a distinguished role model for the next generation of lacrosse players, especially within the African-American community. In July 2020, he co-founded the Black Lacrosse Alliance, which seeks to push the culture of lacrosse forward to become more inclusive and inspire a more diverse generation of lacrosse players.

== Early life and education ==
Harrison is the son of Miles and Wanda Harrison. He grew up in Baltimore, where he started playing lacrosse at age 3. His father, Miles Harrison, a 3rd generation legacy physician, played college lacrosse at Morgan State University, the first HBCU to field a lacrosse team in the NCAA. Kyle's grandfather was a Major in the Army. Kyle wore the number 18 as his father did during his playing years. Although his father influenced Kyle's decision to play lacrosse, he was never pressured to do so. Growing up, Kyle's favorite athlete was Michael Jordan. At an early age, Kyle enrolled in the Friends School of Baltimore up until his high school graduation in 2001. His two cousins, Maxxwell Davis and Marrio Davis also attended Friends School of Baltimore and continued on to play lacrosse at UMBC and McDaniel College respectively.

== 1998–2001: High school career ==
Harrison attended high school at the Friends School of Baltimore, competing in the Maryland Interscholastic Athletic Association (MIAA). At the Friends School, Harrison was a standout tri-athlete playing soccer, basketball and lacrosse. In soccer, he won one MIAA title, and earned all-conference honors. In basketball, he won two MIAA basketball titles, and earned all-conference honors. In lacrosse, he won three consecutive MIAA B-Conference Championships in 1997, 1998 and 1999. He also earned all-America, all-metro, and all-state honors in lacrosse, as well. Kyle Harrison played the midfield position in lacrosse and would frequently take face-offs. In his senior year of high school, he totaled 52 points, scoring 24 goals, netting 28 assists and scooping over 100 ground balls. He was recruited to play NCAA Division 1 lacrosse on the Johns Hopkins Blue Jays men's lacrosse team after performing well at recruiting camps the summer of his junior year of high school. Harrison attended school with best friend Benson Erwin since the second grade, with whom he won the 3 lacrosse championships. Upon graduation from the Friend's School in 2001, the two continued on to play as teammates on the lacrosse team at Johns Hopkins University.

In 2011, Kyle was inducted into the Friends School Hall of Fame.

== 2002–2005: College career ==
Harrison played Division 1 men's lacrosse from 2002 to 2005 for the Johns Hopkins Blue Jays men's lacrosse team for Coach Dave Pietramala. He was a Writing Seminars major. In 2016, he was inducted into the Johns Hopkins University athletics Hall of Fame. He was a 3-time All-American, 2-time McLaughlin Award National Midfielder of the Year, and 2005 Tewaaraton Award National Player of the Year.

Kyle is one of the most decorated players in the long history of Johns Hopkins lacrosse. One of Harrison's college coaches, Seth Tierney, said "Kyle was uncoverable in his last three years. There was not a player in the country that could cover him, and he proved that. At big moments, he had big goals, but the best part is that he was never about himself. He was about making his teammates better and making them more confident.”

Kyle Harrison's college lacrosse career was a landmark in the history of African-American participation in the sport. In 2005, the New York Times described Harrison as "lacrosse's most prominent African-American star since Jim Brown was a first-team all-American at Syracuse in 1957". Historian Bruce Nelson stated that that year's "presence of Kyle Harrison, Johnny Christmas and Harry Alford are indicative of the changes that are occurring".

=== 2002: Freshman season ===
Harrison's first year at Hopkins was also Coach Dave Pietramala's first year as head coach. During Harrison's first year at Hopkins, he was on the first midfield line and started in all 14 games. He totaled 13 points on the season, scoring 9 goals and 4 assists. He was also the team's number one faceoff man, winning 120 out of 190 faceoffs, notching a win percentage of 63.2% and scooping 85 ground balls. His faceoff percentage was the sixth highest in the nation and his ground ball percentage was twelfth highest in the nation, averaging 5.07 ground balls per game. In the season-opener game against defending national champion Princeton, Harrison scored two goals in an 8–5 upset. Also, he was especially effective late in the season, winning 63 out of 87 (72.4%) faceoffs. In the two playoff games, he won 27 out of 42 (64.3%) faceoffs and grabbed 19 ground balls.

=== 2003: Sophomore season ===
During Harrison's sophomore year at Hopkins, he was one of five finalists for the Tewaaraton Award, and the only sophomore amongst them. Additionally, he earned 2003 USILA Second Team All-American honors. Throughout the season, he had a 20-game point-scoring streak that extended from late in the 2002 season through the NCAA Semi-finals against Syracuse University. In the playoffs, he scored five goals and added two assists. In an 11–10 OT victory against North Carolina, he scored a career-high three goals, including the game-winner. Also, he finished the season eighth in the nation in faceoff winning percentage (62.6%), winning 109 out of 174 faceoffs, and leading the team in ground balls with 83 ground balls.

=== 2004: Junior season ===
During Harrison's junior year at Hopkins, he won the McLaughlin Award for the nation's top midfielder, was again a finalist for the Tewaaraton Award, and was a 2004 USILA First Team All-American. He reached a new career high with 33 points on the season, scoring 26 goals and 7 assists. for 33 points. Three of the goals were game-winning goals. In the playoff quarterfinals, he scored three goals and one assist against University of North Carolina, and in the playoff semi-finals, he scored 2 goals against Syracuse University.

=== 2005: Senior season ===
In Harrison's final season at Hopkins, he led the team as co-captain to an undefeated 16–0 season, culminating with winning the 2005 NCAA Division I Men's Lacrosse Championship. This year he was named the Tewaaraton Award recipient, becoming the first minority to receive the award. He also won the McLaughlin Award for the second time, and earned USILA First Team All-American honors for the second time. Throughout the 16 games that season, Harrison scored 24 goals and 20 assists, totaling 44 points. Harrison also played alongside freshman Paul Rabil on this 2005 team, who would continue on to win the 2007 NCAA Division I Men's Lacrosse Championship and the 2007 McLaughlin Award.

=== JHU Hall of Fame Induction ===
Harrison was inducted into the Johns Hopkins University Athletics Hall of Fame in 2016. Throughout his four years at Hopkins, Harrison was a 3-time USILA All-American, 2-time McLaughlin Award National Midfielder of the Year, and 2005 Tewaaraton Award National Player of the Year. More than 15 years after graduating, he remains the only Johns Hopkins player to win the Tewaaraton Award. Harrison netted a collegiate career total of 126 points, scoring 81 goals and 45 assists. As a faceoff specialist for Hopkins, Harrison ranks 3rd in school history with a 61.1% win percentage, victorious in 328 out of 537 faceoffs. Scooping a career total of 304 ground balls, he is one of just 11 players in school history with more than 300 career ground balls.

== 2005–21: Professional lacrosse career ==
=== 2005–09: MLL ===
Kyle Harrison is a 7x MLL all-star.

==== 2005–07: New Jersey Pride ====
Harrison was the first overall draft pick in the MLL for the 2005 season. He was a midfielder with the New Jersey Pride from 2005 until the 2007 season. He played in the MLL All-Star Game in 2005 and 2006. Harrison also played for the 2006 U.S. Men's National Team in World Lacrosse Championship.

==== 2008: Los Angeles Riptide ====
Harrison was traded to the Los Angeles Riptide after the 2007 season. Since joining the Riptide, Harrison has played in the 2008 MLL All-Star Game, and helped the Riptide return to the postseason as a third seed in the NB ZIP MLL Championship Weekend to play for the Steinfeld Cup. The Riptide fell in the semi-final round to the Denver Outlaws.

==== 2009: Denver Outlaws ====
In 2009, Kyle Harrison played for the Denver Outlaws.

=== 2010–14: LXM Pro Tour ===
LXM Pro Tour was founded in late 2009. Kyle Harrison was one of the co-founders with former college All-Americans and professional players Scott Hochstadt, Craig Hochstadt, Xander Ritz and Max Ritz. LXM Pro was in competition with the MLL, was the league of preference over the MLL for several college draftees, such as Sam Bradman, and twins Shamel Bratton and Rhamel Bratton. In 2014, LXM Pro and MLL announced a partnership.

=== 2014–18: MLL ===
==== 2014–18: Ohio Machine ====
In 2014, Kyle Harrison was named the Ohio Machine season MVP. Kyle Harrison led the Ohio Machine to a championship in 2017.

=== 2019–21: PLL ===
==== 2019–21: Redwoods Lacrosse Club ====
From 2019 to 2021, Harrison was a captain on the Redwoods Lacrosse Club of the Premier Lacrosse League. In 2019 and 2021, he was awarded the PLL Brendan Looney Leadership Award. The award was not awarded during 2020. He is also the PLL Director of Player Relations and Diversity Inclusion. He was selected as a 2019 PLL All-Star and a 2021 PLL All-Star.

=== 2021: Retirement ===
In 2021, prior to the season beginning, Harrison announced his retirement, stating that the 2021 season would be his last.

== International Competition (2006-2014) ==
=== 2006 World Lacrosse Championship ===
Kyle Harrison was a midfielder on the 2006 United States national lacrosse team. The team reached the final round of the 2006 World Lacrosse Championship, but lost to Canada.

=== 2014 World Lacrosse Championship ===
Kyle Harrison was a defensive midfielder on the 2014 United States national lacrosse team. The team reached the final round of the 2014 World Lacrosse Championship, but lost to Canada.

== Legacy ==
In 2023, he was inducted into the National Lacrosse Hall of Fame. In 2025, he was inducted into the Professional Lacrosse Hall of Fame.

== Personal life ==
Kyle Harrison has two children, Brooke and Smith, with his wife Meredith.

== Sponsorship ==
Most notably, Kyle Harrison has had a contract with STX for his K18 equipment line that has been adopted as the official gear by many college programs. Harrison first inked this deal right out of college 2005, and that partnership has remained intact to date. This partnership marks the longest-running contract partnership in lacrosse history. Also, right of out of college, Kyle Harrison had a Nike sponsorship manufacturing various sportswear and lacrosse apparel. In 2013, Beats Electronics had personalized custom headphones designed for a select few of celebrities, LeBron James, Wayne Rooney, Justin Bieber, Kobe Bryant, Lady Gaga and Kyle Harrison. Kyle Harrison's personalized headphones had writing in Hopkins blue of the K18 logo, 16–0 (the 2005 lacrosse team undefeated record), 'Finish Strong', 'LXM PRO', and '2005' on it.

== Statistics ==
=== PLL ===
Season	Team	Regular season											Playoffs										
Season	Team	GP	G	2PG	A	Pts	Sh	GB	Pen	PIM	FOW	FOA	GP	G	2PG	A	Pts	Sh	GB	Pen	PIM	FOW	FOA
2019	Redwoods	10	3	0	0	3	31	4	0	0	0	0	3	1	0	1	2	5	0	0	0	0	0
2020	Redwoods	6	2	1	1	4	9	2	0	0	0	0	–	–	–	–	–	–	–	–	–	–	–
2021	Redwoods	9	4	1	1	6	17	2	0	0	0	0	1	1	0	0	1	4	2	0	0	0	0
		25	9	2	2	13	57	8	0	0	0	0	4	2	0	1	3	9	2	0	0	0	0
Career total:		29	11	2	3	16	66	10	0	0	0	0											

GP–Games played; G–Goals; 2PG–2-point goals; A–Assists; Pts–Points; Sh–Shots; GB–Ground balls; Pen–Penalties; PIM–Penalty minutes; FOW–Faceoffs won; FOA–Faceoffs attempted

=== MLL ===
Season	Team	Regular season											Playoffs										
Season	Team	GP	G	2PG	A	Pts	Sh	GB	Pen	PIM	FOW	FOA	GP	G	2PG	A	Pts	Sh	GB	Pen	PIM	FOW	FOA
2005	New Jersey Pride	9	9	0	6	15	46	27	0	5	1	3	–	–	–	–	–	–	–	–	–	–	–
2006	New Jersey Pride	11	8	0	17	25	52	21	0	1	16	33	–	–	–	–	–	–	–	–	–	–	–
2007	New Jersey Pride	12	19	2	6	27	63	35	0	5	8	17	–	–	–	–	–	–	–	–	–	–	–
2008	Los Angeles Riptide	12	17	0	13	30	90	23	0	1	0	1	1	0	0	3	3	2	0	0	0	0	0
2009	Denver Outlaws	7	4	0	2	6	28	5	0	2.5	0	0	2	2	0	0	2	12	3	0	0	0	0
2014	Ohio Machine	13	27	0	6	33	86	4	0	1	0	0	1	1	0	1	2	9	1	0	0	0	0
2015	Ohio Machine	14	18	3	5	26	80	5	0	0	0	0	1	0	0	1	1	6	0	0	0	0	0
2016	Ohio Machine	11	16	2	5	23	67	10	0	1	0	0	2	2	0	3	5	10	1	0	0	0	0
2017	Ohio Machine	7	7	0	4	11	32	3	0	0.5	0	0	2	1	0	1	2	4	2	0	0	0	0
2018	Ohio Machine	10	8	1	6	15	42	7	0	1.5	0	0	–	–	–	–	–	–	–	–	–	–	–
		106	133	8	70	211	586	140	0	18.5	25	54	9	6	0	9	15	34	7	0	0	0	0
Career total:		115	139	8	79	226	620	147	0	18.5	25	54											

GP–Games played; G–Goals; 2PG–2-point goals; A–Assists; Pts–Points; Sh–Shots; GB–Ground balls; Pen–Penalties; PIM–Penalty minutes; FOW–Faceoffs won; FOA–Faceoffs attempted

=== NCAA ===
Season	Team	GP	G	A	Pts	GB
2002	Johns Hopkins	14	9	4	13	85
2003	Johns Hopkins	16	22	14	36	83
2004	Johns Hopkins	15	26	7	33	69
2005	Johns Hopkins	16	24	20	44	67
Totals		61	81	45	126	304

=== High school ===
Season	Team	G	A	Pts	GB
2001	Friends School	24	28	52	100

== Awards ==
PLL:

- 2x Brendan Looney Leadership Award
- 2x All Star

MLL:

- 7x All Star
- 2017 MLL Championship
- 2014 Ohio Machine Team MVP

NCAA:

- 2016 Johns Hopkins University Athletics Hall of Fame Inductee
- 2005 Tewaaraton Award
- 2005 NCAA Division I Men's Lacrosse Championship
- 2005 Undefeated Season (16–0)
- 2x McLaughlin Award (2005, 2004)
- 3x Top 5 Tewaaraton Finalist (2004, 2003)
- 2003 2nd-Team All-American

Other:

- Baltimore Hall of Fame Induction (2016)

Preceded by Michael Powell	Men's Tewaaraton Trophy; 2005	Succeeded by Matt Ward
Preceded by Chris Rotelli	McLaughlin Award; 2004 & 2005	Succeeded by Joe Boulukos & Kyle Dixon
