= Chris Rotelli =

American lacrosse player

Personal information
- Nickname: Roto
- Nationality: American
- Born: December 18, 1980 (age 44) Providence, Rhode Island, U.S.
- Height: 5 ft 10 in (178 cm)
- Weight: 180 lb (82 kg; 12 st 12 lb)

Sport
- Position: Midfield
- NLL draft: 57th overall, 2003; Rochester Knighthawks
- MLL teams: San Francisco Dragons; Philadelphia Barrage; Boston Cannons
- NCAA team: University of Virginia
- Pro career: 2003–

Chris Rotelli (born December 18, 1980) is a professional lacrosse player who had a standout collegiate career at the University of Virginia before going on to the professional ranks in Major League Lacrosse.

== High school and collegiate career ==
A native of Rumford, Rhode Island, Chris Rotelli played high school lacrosse at Moses Brown School, where he was a three-time high school All-American and four-time All-State selection. He then attended the University of Virginia from 2000 to 2003, where he became one of the most decorated midfielders in Cavaliers history. As a senior in 2003, Rotelli helped lead the team to the 2003 NCAA Division I National Championship. He was the team's leading scorer with 49 points and was among the ACC leaders in scoring, goals, and assists. That year, he won the Tewaaraton Trophy as the nation's top college lacrosse player, the McLaughlin Award as the nation's best midfielder, the ACC Player of the Year, and was selected as a First Team All-American by the USILA. In addition, he became the first lacrosse player in history to win the ACC Male Athlete of the Year award (Anthony J. McKevlin Award) and was the first overall pick in the Major League Lacrosse collegiate draft.

== Professional career ==
Rotelli was drafted first overall in the 2003 Major League Lacrosse college draft by the Bridgeport Barrage. After the 2003 season he was traded to the Boston Cannons where he played during the 2004 and 2005 seasons. When the MLL expanded to include several new teams, he was drafted in the first round (second overall) in the 2006 MLL Expansion Draft by the San Francisco Dragons. In 2006 and 2007, he served as co-captain of the Dragons. The Dragons have since ceased operations, but now he plays for the Chicago Machine.

Rotelli also runs youth instructional lacrosse camps and is the Founder and CEO of ADVNC Lacrosse.

== Awards and achievements ==
- 4 time Major League Lacrosse All-Star 2005, 2006, 2007, 2010
- Number 1 overall pick in 2003 MLL draft
- San Francisco Dragons Team Co-Captain 2006, 2007
- Tewaaraton Trophy 2003 - best NCAA lacrosse player
- ACC Male Athlete of the Year 2003 (Anthony J. McKevlin Award)
- ACC Player of the Year 2003
- McLaughlin Award 2003 - nation's top midfielder
- Member of the NCAA Division 1 Champion University of Virginia team 2003
- 3 time USILA All-American (Honorable Mention 2001; First Team 2002, 2003)
- NCAA All-Tournament team 2003
- 3 time All-ACC
- ACC All-Tournament team 2003
- University of Virginia Team Co-Captain 2003
- ACC Championship 2000, 2003
- 3 time High School All-American - Moses Brown High School, Rhode Island

Preceded by Juan Dixon	ACC Male Athlete of the Year; 2004	Succeeded by Philip Rivers
Preceded by Michael Powell	Men's Tewaaraton Trophy; 2003	Succeeded by Michael Powell
Preceded by Kevin Cassese	McLaughlin Award; 2003	Succeeded by Kyle Harrison

== Statistics ==
=== University of Virginia ===
Season	GP	G	A	Pts	GB
2000	15	7	1	8	18
2001	14	28	7	35	44
2002	15	24	10	34	35
2003		26	23	49
Totals		85	41	126
