= Michael Powell (lacrosse) =

American lacrosse player (born 1982)

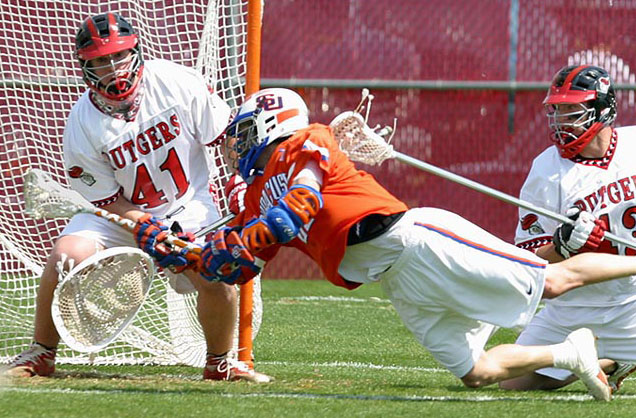

Personal information
- Nationality: American
- Born: October 29, 1982 (age 43) West Carthage, New York, U.S.
- Height: 5 ft 11 in (180 cm)

Sport
- Position: Attack
- Shoots: Right
- NLL draft: 17th overall, 2004; San Jose Stealth
- MLL teams: Boston Cannons; Baltimore Bayhawks
- NCAA team: Syracuse

Michael Powell (born October 29, 1982) is an American former professional lacrosse player who was a four-time First Team All-American at Syracuse University, played professional lacrosse for the Baltimore Bayhawks and Boston Cannons, and played on the United States team in the 2002 and 2006 World Lacrosse Championships where he was named to the All-World Team. He is the youngest of the three lacrosse-playing Powell brothers (Ryan and Casey Powell).

Powell is the only player to win the Jack Turnbull Award as the top attackman in Division I lacrosse four consecutive times. Powell was also a four-time finalist for the Tewaaraton Trophy, the collegiate player of the year award, and is one of two male players to win the award twice. He led Syracuse to two national championships and holds the school record for most career points. Syracuse retired his #22 jersey in 2023. He is widely considered one of the greatest lacrosse players of all time.

Powell is now a singer/songwriter and tours both as a solo artist and as a member of his band The Black River. In 2022 Powell started a new band called The Echosound (formerly WADE).

== Early life ==
Powell attended Carthage Senior High School in Carthage, New York, where he was a high school All-American. He set the New York State high school records for most points in a season with 194 points in 2000, most points in a game with 15 points in 2000, and most assists in a season with 120 assists in 1999 and 115 in 2000.

== College career ==
Powell enrolled at Syracuse in the fall of 2000 as one of the most anticipated recruits in college lacrosse history. He wore the #22 Syracuse jersey, the same number previously worn by both of his older brothers (Casey and Ryan), and by lacrosse legends Gary Gait and Charlie Lockwood.

=== 2001 season ===
In his freshman season, Michael Powell tallied 30 goals, 40 assists (70 points), and 69 groundballs while leading Syracuse to the NCAA Men's Lacrosse Championship title game against Princeton University. In the championship game, he scored an unassisted goal with just 16 seconds remaining in regulation to force overtime, but Syracuse lost to Princeton on a B.J. Prager goal with 41 seconds left in overtime. Powell became the first player in Syracuse lacrosse history to be named a First Team All-American as a freshman. He was also awarded the Jack Turnbull Award as the nation's top attackman, and was a finalist for the inaugural Tewaaraton Trophy.

=== 2002 season ===
In 2002, Powell scored 42 goals and 42 assists en route to leading Syracuse to a national championship. With four goals and three assists in the championship game, he was named the NCAA Tournament's Most Outstanding Player and won his first Tewaaraton Trophy.

=== 2003 season ===
Powell missed the fall 2002 semester and fall practice at Syracuse but was able to regain academic eligibility before the 2003 lacrosse season. Scored 31 goals and 33 assists for 64 points. Despite the aggressive defenses that targeted him during the season, he helped lead Syracuse to the Final Four, of what would eventually be 22 consecutive Final Fours, an NCAA record. Syracuse fell to Johns Hopkins University 19–8 in the semifinals.

=== 2004 season ===
As a senior, Powell led the Orangemen to their ninth NCAA championship. In the NCAA tournament, Syracuse defeated top-seeded Johns Hopkins in the semifinal round 15–9 and then beat second-seeded Navy in the championship game 14–13. On the season, Powell scored 89 points (47 goals, 42 assists), surpassing the Syracuse record shared by his two older brothers to become the all-time leading scorer at Syracuse with 307 points. That number ties him for 12th all-time in NCAA history. Powell was again selected as a First Team All-American, becoming just the sixth lacrosse player to earn that recognition four times, won his second Tewaaraton Trophy, and his first Enners Trophy as the most outstanding player in men's college lacrosse.

== Professional career ==
Following his graduation, Powell surprised many in the lacrosse community when he chose not to play professional lacrosse for Major League Lacrosse (MLL) in the 2004 season. Instead, he pursued a career as a professional musician. Powell, along with his two older brothers, also signed an endorsement contract with lacrosse equipment manufacturer Brine, Corp., with Powell working out of Brine's west coast office. Casey and Ryan had previously been employed by Warrior Sports.

In 2005, Powell joined the MLL and was drafted by the Baltimore Bayhawks, where he and teammate Gary Gait led the Bayhawks to the league championship. Powell also played in the MLL All-Star Game, where he was selected as MVP. He sat out the 2006 MLL season. On March 21, 2007, Powell, along with Ben DeFelice and a 2008 conditional draft choice, was traded from the Baltimore Bayhawks to the Boston Cannons in exchange for Ryan Curtis and Conor Gill.

Powell was a member of U.S. World Team in the 2006 World Lacrosse Championship, where he was the U.S.'s leading scorer and was selected to the All-World Team. The U.S. team fell to Canada in the championship game, 15–10, marking the second time the Americans had lost to the Canadians in 14 contests.

== Personal life and music career ==
Powell is a traveling musician and an accomplished writer with over two hundred songs. Heavily influenced by Woody Guthrie, Bob Dylan, John Prine, and Townes Van Zandt. He has released 6 albums, "Strange Bedfellows" 2007, "Replevin" in 2009, "The Night The Date Was Tied" in 2010, "Kapow" 2011, "Tied To The Rail" 2014, "Classic Universe" 2018. The single "Twenty One Rounds" was released on Memorial Day 2018.

== Statistics ==
=== Syracuse ===
Season	GP	G	A	Pts	PPG
2001	16	30	40	70	--
2002	17	42	42	84	--
2003	16	31	33	64	--
2004	17	47	42	89	--
66		150	157 ^{(a)}	307 ^{(b)}	--

^{(a)} 13th in NCAA Division I career assists
^{(b)} 6th in NCAA Division I career points

== Awards ==
Preceded by Tillman Johnson	Lt. Raymond Enners Award; 2004	Succeeded by Kyle Harrison
Preceded by Doug Shanahan	Men's Tewaaraton Trophy; 2002	Succeeded by Chris Rotelli
Preceded by Chris Rotelli	Men's Tewaaraton Trophy; 2004	Succeeded by Kyle Harrison
Preceded by Ryan Powell	Jack Turnbull Award; 2001, 2002, 2003, & 2004	Succeeded by Matt Danowski
Preceded by Gary Gait	Major League Lacrosse All-Star Game MVP; 2005	Succeeded by Kevin Cassese

== See also ==
- 2002 NCAA Division I men's lacrosse tournament
- 2004 NCAA Division I men's lacrosse tournament
- Casey Powell
- Ryan Powell
- Syracuse Orange men's lacrosse
