= 2006 Major League Lacrosse collegiate draft =

2006 Collegiate Draft of Major League Lacrosse

	# Overall	Team	Player	College
Round 1	1	Rochester (from Chicago)	Joe Walters	Maryland
Round 1	2	Baltimore (from Denver)	Kyle Dixon	Virginia
Round 1	3	Chicago (from San Francisco)	Sean Morris	Massachusetts
Round 1	4	Baltimore (from Long Island)	Matt Ward	Virginia
Round 1	5	Baltimore (from Denver)	Bill McGlone	Maryland
Round 1	6	Philadelphia	Matt Zash	Duke
Round 1	7	Chicago (from Rochester)	Michael Culver	Virginia
Round 1	8	Rochester (from Boston)	Chris Unterstein	Hofstra
Round 1	9	Philadelphia (from Long Island)	Greg Peyser	Johns Hopkins
Round 1	10	Rochester (from San Francisco)	Jack Reid	Massachusetts
Round 2	11	Los Angeles	D.J. Driscoll	Notre Dame
Round 2	12	Boston (from San Francisco)	Matt Poskay	Virginia
Round 2	13	Baltimore (from Denver)	Brendan Healy	Maryland
Round 2	14	Boston (from Chicago)	Brett Bucktooth	Syracuse
Round 2	15	Baltimore	John Keysor	Hofstra
Round 2	16	Chicago (from New Jersey)	Joe Boulukos	Cornell
Round 2	17	Denver (from Long Island)	Geoff Snider	Denver
Round 2	18	Denver (from Rochester)	Brett Moyer	Hofstra
Round 2	19	San Francisco (from Boston)	Joe Yevoli	Syracuse
Round 2	20	Denver (from Long Island)	Casey Cittadino	Towson
Round 3	21	Denver (from Baltimore)	Brendan Mundorf	UMBC
Round 3	22	San Francisco (from Chicago)	Steve Holmes	Virginia
Round 3	23	Rochester (from Denver)	Greg Gurenlian	Penn State
Round 3	24	San Francisco	Steven McElduff	North Carolina
Round 3	25	San Francisco (from Los Angeles)	Kyle Dowd	Duke
Round 3	26	New Jersey	Reyn Garnett	Georgetown
Round 3	27	Philadelphia	Xander Ritz	Maryland
Round 3	28	Rochester	JJ Morrissey	Virginia
Round 3	29	Boston	Dave Andrzejewski	Pennsylvania
Round 3	30	Long Island	Jake Deane	Massachusetts
Round 4	31	Rochester (from Baltimore)	Brian Crockett	Syracuse
Round 4	32	Baltimore (from Los Angeles)	Greg Havalchak	Rutgers
Round 4	33	San Francisco	Brad Heritage	Dartmouth
Round 4	34	Long Island (from Denver)	Pat Walsh	Notre Dame
Round 4	35	Chicago	Dan Flannery	Duke
Round 4	36	New Jersey	Dave Paolisso	Georgetown
Round 4	37	Philadelphia	Pete Cannon	Georgetown
Round 4	38	Rochester	Nate Kenney	Syracuse
Round 4	39	Boston	Jamie Coffin	Dartmouth
Round 4	40	Long Island	John Orsen	Hofstra
Round 5	41	San Francisco (from Baltimore)	Michael Abou Jaude	Bucknell
Round 5	42	Chicago	Adam Goodwin	Denver
Round 5	43	Denver	Sean McCarth	Hofstra
Round 5	44	New Jersey (from San Francisco)	Jason Cappadoro	Stony Brook
Round 5	45	Los Angeles	Devon Britts	Rutgers
Round 5	46	New Jersey	Jon Birsner	Navy
Round 5	47	Philadelphia	Joseph Canuso	Villanova
Round 5	48	Rochester	Alex Civalier	Nazareth
Round 5	49	Boston	Ryan"P-Diddles" Danehy	Dartmouth
Round 5	50	Long Island	Adam Blechman	Pennsylvania
Round 5	51	Baltimore	Matt Russell	Navy
