= 2003 Major League Lacrosse collegiate draft =

2003 Collegiate Draft of Major League Lacrosse

| | # Overall | Team | Player | Position | College |
|---|---|---|---|---|---|
| Round 1 | 1 | Bridgeport | Chris Rotelli | Midfielder | Virginia |
| Round 1 | 2 | Rochester | Kevin Cassese | Midfielder | Duke |
| Round 1 | 3 | Boston | Chris Fiore | Midfielder | Massachusetts |
| Round 1 | 4 | New Jersey | A.J. Shannon | Midfielder | Virginia |
| Round 1 | 5 | New Jersey (from Long Island) | Ryan McClay | Defense | Cornell |
| Round 1 | 6 | Bridgeport (from Baltimore) | Mike Springer | Attackman | Syracuse |
| Round 2 | 7 | Rochester (from Baltimore) | Adam Doneger | Midfielder | Johns Hopkins |
| Round 2 | 8 | Rochester | Michael Howley | Defense | Maryland |
| Round 2 | 9 | Boston | Kevin Leveille | Midfielder | Massachusetts |
| Round 2 | 10 | New Jersey | Austin Garrison | Midfielder | North Carolina |
| Round 2 | 11 | Boston (from Long Island) | Michael Peyser | Defense | Johns Hopkins |
| Round 2 | 12 | Boston (from Baltimore) | Damien Davis | Defense | Princeton |
| Round 3 | 13 | Bridgeport | Kyle Sweeney | Defense | Georgetown |
| Round 3 | 14 | Rochester | Mike Mollot | Midfielder | Maryland |
| Round 3 | 15 | Boston | Chris Garrity | Goalkeeper | Penn State |
| Round 3 | 16 | New Jersey | Pat Collins | Defense | Georgetown |
| Round 3 | 17 | Rochester (from Long Island) | Billy Glading | Midfielder | Virginia |
| Round 3 | 18 | Baltimore | Ryan Moran | Midfielder | Maryland |
| Round 4 | 19 | Bridgeport | Dan Cocchi | Defense | Towson |
| Round 4 | 20 | Rochester | Sol Bliss | Defense | Syracuse |
| Round 4 | 21 | Boston | Bobby Benson | Attackman | Johns Hopkins |
| Round 4 | 22 | Baltimore (from Bridgeport) | Josh Bergey | Attackman | Salisbury |
| Round 4 | 23 | Long Island | Kevin Brennan | Midfielder | Duke |
| Round 4 | 24 | Baltimore | Trey Whitty | Defense | Virginia |
| Round 5 | 25 | Bridgeport | Tom Fallon | Defense | Massachusetts |
| Round 5 | 26 | Rochester | Tim Booth | Midfielder | Hobart |
| Round 5 | 27 | Boston | Ned Bowen | Defense | Virginia |
| Round 5 | 28 | New Jersey | Alex Kopicki | Midfielder | Pennsylvania |
| Round 5 | 29 | Long Island | Joe Kostolansky | Midfielder | Hofstra |
| Round 5 | 30 | Baltimore | Adam Baxter | Defense | Towson |
