= 2001 Major League Lacrosse collegiate draft =

The 2001 Collegiate Draft of Major League Lacrosse was held on January 13, 2001.

	# Overall	Team	Player	Position	College
Round 1	1	Long Island	Sal Locasio	Defense	Massachusetts
Round 1	2	New Jersey	Trevor Tierney	Goalkeeper	Princeton
Round 1	3	Baltimore	Adam Borcz	Midfielder	Navy
Round 1	4	Long Island	Eric Wedin	Midfielder	Johns Hopkins
Round 1	5	Rochester (from Boston)	Chris Cercy	Midfielder	Syracuse
Round 1	6	Baltimore (from Bridgeport)	Gavin Prout	Midfielder	Loyola
Round 2	7	Bridgeport (from Rochester)	Keith Cromwell	Attackman	Rutgers
Round 2	8	Boston	Mike Law	Midfielder	Denver
Round 2	9	Long Island	Rob Mulligan	Goalkeeper	Syracuse
Round 2	10	Baltimore	Jeff Sonke	Attackman	North Carolina
Round 2	11	New Jersey	Chris Malone	Midfielder	Maryland
Round 2	12	Bridgeport	Rodger Colbert	Defense	Georgetown
Round 3	13	Rochester	Steve Bishko	Midfielder	Notre Dame
Round 3	14	New Jersey	Rob Torti	Midfielder	Princeton
Round 3	15	Baltimore	Shawn Nadelen	Defense	Johns Hopkins
Round 3	16	Long Island	Brandon Testa	Defense	Johns Hopkins
Round 3	17	Boston	Mike Henehan	Midfielder	Georgetown
Round 3	18	Bridgeport	Pat McGinnis	Goalkeeper	Maryland
Round 4	19	Bridgeport	Matt Striebel	Midfielder	Princeton
Round 4	20	Boston	Scott Doyle	Midfielder	Georgetown
Round 4	21	Long Island	Rich Kunkel	Midfielder	Massachusetts
Round 4	22	Baltimore	Tom Glatzel	Attackman	Notre Dame
Round 4	23	New Jersey	Justin Berry	Midfielder	Towson
Round 4	24	Rochester	Holt Hopkins	Attackman	Middlebury
Round 5	25	Rochester	Eric Goodberlet	Midfielder	Nazareth
Round 5	26	New Jersey	Todd Minerly	Attackman	Pennsylvania
Round 5	27	Baltimore	David Ulrich	Attackman	Notre Dame
Round 5	28	Long Island	Bobby Horsey	Midfielder	Loyola
Round 5	29	Boston	Kenny Crowley	Defense	Denver
Round 5	30	Bridgeport	Bobby Gormsen	Defense	North Carolina
