= 2002 Major League Lacrosse collegiate draft =

2002 Collegiate Draft of Major League Lacrosse

Josh Coffman was selected as the top pick.

	# Overall	Team	Player	College
Round 1	1	Rochester (from Bridgeport)	Josh Coffman	Syracuse
Round 1	2	Boston	Steve Dusseau	Georgetown
Round 1	3	Boston (from NJ)	Conor Gill	Virginia
Round 1	4	Bridgeport (from Rochester)	Nick Polanco	Hofstra
Round 1	5	Rochester (from Boston)	John Glatzel	Syracuse
Round 1	6	Baltimore (from Long Island)	Tom Kessler	Hofstra
Round 2	7	Long Island (from Bridgeport)	Matt McFarland	Massachusetts
Round 2	8	Boston	Don Little	Massachusetts
Round 2	9	New Jersey	Scott Dooley	Hofstra
Round 2	10	Rochester	Will Driscoll	Penn State
Round 2	11	Long Island	Dan Paccione	Massachusetts
Round 2	12	Baltimore	Justin Cynar	Cornell
Round 3	13	Boston (from Bridgeport)	Jimmy Mormile	Brown
Round 3	14	Boston	Marko Lujic	Yale
Round 3	15	New Jersey	Brian Solliday	Syracuse
Round 3	16	Boston (from Rochester)	Galen Beers	Cornell
Round 3	17	Long Island	Nick Murtha	Johns Hopkins
Round 3	18	Baltimore	Billy St. George	Syracuse
Round 4	19	Bridgeport	Devin Ryan	Notre Dame
Round 4	20	Long Island (from Boston)	Tim Pearson	Army
Round 4	21	Bridgeport (from New Jersey)	Josh Tankersley	Towson
Round 4	22	Rochester	Mark Koontz	Virginia
Round 4	23	Rochester (from Bridgeport)	Nate Watkins	Maryland
Round 4	24	Baltimore	Brad Reppert	Towson
Round 5	25	Bridgeport	Marc Morley	Massachusetts
Round 5	26	Boston	Scott Yavarow	Bentley
Round 5	27	New Jersey	P.J. DiConza	Johns Hopkins
Round 5	28	Rochester	Dan Chemotti	Duke
Round 5	29	Bridgeport (from Long Island)	Nick Russo	Virginia
Round 5	30	Baltimore	Brenndan Mohler	Virginia
