= Johnny Christmas =

American lacrosse player and coach

Personal information
- Nickname: NOSOTROS
- Nationality: American
- Born: August 16, 1982 (age 43) Ardmore, Pennsylvania, U.S.
- Height: 6 ft 0 in (183 cm)
- Weight: 200 lb (91 kg; 14 st 4 lb)

Sport
- Position: Attack
- Shoots: Both
- Coached by: De La Salle High School
- NLL draft: 49th overall, 2005; Philadelphia Wings
- NLL team: Philadelphia Wings
- MLL team: Chesapeake Bayhawks
- NCAA team: University of Virginia
- Pro career: 2006–

John Christmas (born August 16, 1982 in Ardmore, Pennsylvania) is an American retired lacrosse player. He played for the Philadelphia Wings of the National Lacrosse League and for the Boston Cannons of Major League Lacrosse.

Christmas played at the University of Virginia from 2002 to 2005, where he was a two-time USILA All-American and two-time All-ACC selection, and helped lead the Cavaliers to the 2003 NCAA Division I Men's Lacrosse Championship.

Christmas is the head lacrosse coach for the De La Salle high school boys' lacrosse program.

== Professional career ==
Christmas was selected by the Philadelphia Wings in the fifth round (49th overall) of the 2005 Entry Draft. In his first season, he played sparingly, only appearing in two games. Beginning with the 2007 season, Christmas saw his playing time increase by being on the field during defensive situations in order to take advantage of his speed in the transition game. In Week 3 of the 2008 NLL season, Christmas was awarded "Transition Player of the Week" honors

Christmas was selected by the Boston Cannons in the first round (5th overall) of the 2005 MLL Collegiate Draft. He won the MLL Most Improved Player honors in his second season in the league, and appeared in the 2006 MLL All-Star Game.

Christmas was named to Team USA in the 2007 World Indoor Lacrosse Championships.

The Wings announced that John Christmas would not play the 2009 season, instead taking the year to focus on establishing a non-profit organization in Philadelphia called L.E.A.P.S. (Lacrosse, Education, Attitude, Perseverance, Success).

Christmas has worked as a volunteer assistant coach at Penn. He also runs 141 Lacrosse training to handle lacrosse camp counseling.

== Statistics ==
=== University of Virginia ===
Season	GP	G	A	Pts	PPG	GB
2002	15	29	15	44	2.93	33
2003	17	36	12	48	2.82	34
2004	12	11	10	21	1.75	15
2005	14	19	20	39	2.79	21
Totals	58	95	57	152	2.62	103

=== NLL ===
		Regular Season						Playoffs
Season	Team	GP	G	A	Pts	LB	PIM	GP	G	A	Pts	LB	PIM
2006	Philadelphia	2	1	1	2	3	0	0	0	0	0	0	0
2007	Philadelphia	14	4	2	6	51	10	0	0	0	0	0	0
2008	Philadelphia	13	5	20	25	61	10	0	0	0	0	0	0
2010	Philadelphia	11	8	9	17	34	10	0	0	0	0	0	0
NLL totals		40	18	32	40	115	20	0	0	0	0	0	0

=== MLL ===
		Regular Season							Playoffs
Season	Team	GP	G	2ptG	A	Pts	LB	PIM	GP	G	2ptG	A	Pts	LB	PIM
2005	Boston	7	5	0	3	8	4	8.5	1	0	0	0	0	1	0
2006	Boston	12	21	0	16	37	22	1	1	1	0	0	1	0	0
2007	Boston	12	24	1	19	44	12	1.5	-	-	-	-	-	-	-
2008	Boston	11	13	0	15	28	21	1	1	1	0	0	1	0	0
2009	Boston	7	5	0	2	7	3	1	1	0	0	0	0	0	0
2010	Chesapeake	3	2	0	2			1	1	1	0	0	1	0	0
MLL Totals		49	68	1	53	124	52	12	3	1	0	0	1	1	0

== Personal life ==
Johnny Christmas is of Trinidadian descent.

== See also ==
- Virginia Cavaliers men's lacrosse
- Lacrosse in Pennsylvania
