= 2008 Major League Lacrosse collegiate draft =

The 2008 Collegiate Draft of Major League Lacrosse was held on May 28, 2008.

	# Overall	Team	Player	Position	College
Round 1	1	Boston (from Chicago)	Paul Rabil	Midfielder	Johns Hopkins
Round 1	2	New Jersey (from San Francisco through Los Angeles)	Matt Danowski	Attackman	Duke
Round 1	3	New Jersey	Mike Leveille	Attackman	Syracuse
Round 1	4	Chicago (from Washington through Boston)	Stephen Peyser	Midfielder, F/O	Johns Hopkins
Round 1	5	Los Angeles (from Long Island)	Kevin Buchanan	Attackman	Ohio State
Round 1	6	Chicago (from Boston)	Steven Brooks (lacrosse)	Midfielder	Syracuse
Round 1	7	San Francisco (from Denver)	Mike Podgajny	Midfielder	Notre Dame
Round 1	8	Chicago (from Rochester through Boston)	Terry Kimener	Midfielder	UMBC
Round 1	9	New Jersey (from Los Angeles)	Joe Cinosky	Defenseman	Maryland
Round 1	10	New Jersey (from Philadelphia through Chicago)	Jordan Levine	Midfielder	Albany
Round 2	11	Chicago	Will Barrow	Midfielder	Virginia
Round 2	12	New Jersey (from San Francisco)	Tony McDevitt	Defenseman	Duke
Round 2	13	Denver (from New Jersey)	Dan Cocoziello	Defenseman	Princeton
Round 2	14	Long Island (from Washington through Los Angeles)	Ben Rubeor	Attackman	Virginia
Round 2	15	Washington (from Long Island)	Matt Bocklet	Defenseman	Johns Hopkins
Round 2	16	San Francisco (from Boston)	Matt Lalli	Midfielder	Colgate
Round 2	17	San Francisco (from Denver)	Kevin Huntley	Attackman	Johns Hopkins
Round 2	18	Rochester	Kyle Guadagnolo	Defenseman	Syracuse
Round 2	19	Long Island (from Los Angeles)	Jerry Lambe	Defenseman	Georgetown
Round 2	20	New Jersey (from Philadelphia)	Kevin Unterstein	Midfielder	Hofstra
Round 3	21	New Jersey (from Chicago)	Dan Brennan	Midfielder	Syracuse
Round 3	22	Rochester (from San Francisco)	Nick O'Hara	Defenseman	Duke
Round 3	23	Chicago (from New Jersey)	Brendan Cannon	Attackman	Georgetown
Round 3	24	Los Angeles (from Washington)	Mike McDonald	Midfielder	Le Moyne
Round 3	25	San Francisco (from Long Island through Los Angeles)	Brendan Loftus	Midfielder	Syracuse
Round 3	26	Boston	Paul Manesis	Midfielder	Massachusetts
Round 3	27	Denver	Mike Ward	Midfielder	Duke
Round 3	28	Rochester	Adam Fullerton	Goalkeeper	Army
Round 3	29	Los Angeles	Joey Kemp	Goalkeeper	Notre Dame
Round 3	30	New Jersey (from Philadelphia through Chicago then Rochester)	Alex Hewit	Goalkeeper	Princeton
Round 4	31	Washington (from Chicago)	Brett Manney	Midfielder	Delaware
Round 4	32	San Francisco	Ryan Cranston	Midfielder	Lynchburg
Round 4	33	New Jersey	Matthew Hickman	Attackman	Salisbury
Round 4	34	Washington	Sean Dougherty	Defenseman	Notre Dame
Round 4	35	Long Island	Mike Unterstein	Midfielder	Hofstra
Round 4	36	San Francisco (from Boston)	Sean Krygier	Defenseman	Massachusetts
Round 4	37	Washington (from Denver)	Paul Richards	Midfielder	Loyola
Round 4	38	Boston (from Rochester)	Chris Eck	Face-off	Colgate
Round 4	39	San Francisco (from Long Island through Boston)	Daryl Veltman	Attackman	Hobart
Round 4	40	Long Island (from Philadelphia)	Jon Engelke	Attackman	Towson
Round 5	41	Chicago	Bud Petit	Goalkeeper	Virginia
Round 5	42	San Francisco	Thomas Michaelsen	Midfielder	St. John's
Round 5	43	New Jersey	Nick Mirabito	Attackman	Navy
Round 5	44	Washington	Brekan Kohlitz	Face-off	Michigan
Round 5	45	Long Island	Ryan Heath	Attackman	Cortland
Round 5	46	Boston	Tony Tanzi	Midfielder	Sacred Heart
Round 5	47	Denver	Peter Striebel	Midfielder	Princeton
Round 5	48	Rochester	Brett Queener	Goalkeeper	Albany
Round 5	49	Los Angeles	Taylor Clagett	Face-off	Notre Dame
Round 5	50	Long Island (from Philadelphia)	Brian Danvers	Defenseman	Massachusetts
