= Major League Lacrosse =

Field lacrosse league that merged with the Premier Lacrosse League in 2020

- Sport: Field lacrosse
- Founded: 1999
- First season: 2001
- Folded: 2020 (Merger)
- Country: United States
- Last champions: Boston Cannons (2nd title)
- Most titles: Chesapeake Bayhawks (6 titles)
- Broadcasters: ESPN, Stadium, Lax Sports Network

Major League Lacrosse (MLL) was a men's field lacrosse league in the United States. The league's inaugural season was in 2001. Teams played anywhere from ten to 16 games in a summertime regular season. This was followed by a four-team playoff for the championship trophy, the Steinfeld Trophy, named after founder Jake Steinfeld. League attendance peaked at 6,417 in 2011 and the 2019 average was 4,587.

The Chesapeake Bayhawks and New York Lizards (originally the Baltimore Bayhawks and Long Island Lizards) were MLL members throughout its existence and competed in the first three championship games, with the Lizards winning two. The Boston Cannons, the last of the six charter franchises to remain in their original market with their original name, won their first championship in 2011. The Philadelphia Barrage returned to the league in 2020 after an 11-season hiatus. After moving from Bridgeport to Philadelphia, the Barrage won three championships in four years from 2004 to 2007. For much of the league's history, the Denver Outlaws were the only team west of the Mississippi River, being part of the league's ambitious westward expansion in 2006. Being owned by the Pat Bowlen family and the Denver Broncos, the Outlaws were successful from the start, missing the postseason only once in 14 seasons, while claiming three championships in ten appearances. The Connecticut Hammerheads were the league's youngest franchise, and were set to play at Rafferty Stadium near Bridgeport in 2020 before the COVID-19 pandemic forced a shortened, quarantined season.

The final champions were the Boston Cannons, who defeated the Denver Outlaws at Navy-Marine Corps Memorial Stadium in Annapolis, Maryland, following a COVID-19-shortened 2020 season.

On December 16, 2020, the league announced that it would be merging with the Premier Lacrosse League. At the time of the announcement, the 2020 MLL champion Boston Cannons were announced as the only team continuing play in the 2021 season as members of the PLL. Their roster would be set via expansion draft and, following PLL style, dropping "Boston" from their name, becoming the Cannons Lacrosse Club.

== History ==
=== Founding (2001–2005) ===
MLL Progression
Year	Teams	Games played
2001	6 teams	14 games
2002	6 teams	14 games
2003	6 teams	12 games
2004	6 teams	12 games
2005	6 teams	12 games
2006	10 teams	12 games
2007	10 teams	12 games
2008	10 teams	12 games
2009	6 teams	12 games
2010	6 teams	12 games
2011	6 teams	12 games
2012	8 teams	14 games
2013	8 teams	14 games
2014	8 teams	14 games
2015	8 teams	14 games
2016	9 teams	14 games
2017	9 teams	14 games
2018	9 teams	14 games
2019	6 teams	16 games
2020	6 teams	5 games

Major League Lacrosse was founded in 1999 by Jake Steinfeld, Dave Morrow and Tim Robertson. Steinfeld is the creator of the Body By Jake line of exercise equipment and videos. Morrow is a former All-American lacrosse player at Princeton and the president of Warrior Sports. Tim Robertson is the son of televangelist Pat Robertson and the former CEO of The Family Channel.

Steinfeld was a former lacrosse player at Cortland State (NY), read an article about Dave Morrow. After reading the article, Steinfeld couldn't believe that with the excitement the sport of lacrosse has, there was not a professional outdoor league. Steinfeld said, "For years, America's top collegiate lacrosse players have not had the opportunity to play in a professional outdoor league at the conclusion of their collegiate careers. Those days are over with the creation of Major League Lacrosse."

The league held two separate drafts to stock the six teams for the 2001 season. The first draft took place in 2000 for post-collegiate players. A second draft was held on June 1, 2001, in Baltimore, Maryland, for players whose college eligibility had expired in 2001. Ryan Mollett of Princeton was selected first overall by the Rochester Rattlers. In addition, each team was assigned three franchise players to each team before the initial draft.

MLL began play in 2001 with six teams in the northeastern U.S. split into two divisions. The American Division included teams in Boston, Bridgeport, Connecticut, and on Long Island; the National Division included teams in Baltimore, New Jersey, and Rochester. All teams were owned by the league, which assigned three franchise players to each team before the initial draft.

The first MLL game took place on June 7, 2001, with the Baltimore Bayhawks defeating the Long Island Lizards 16–13 at Homewood field in Baltimore, Maryland. Chris Turner scored the first goal in MLL history.

The MLL played a 14-game regular season its first two years, then the schedule was cut to 12 games. After the first year, the league's playoff format had the top teams in each division advancing to the semifinals, with two wild card playoff spots going to the teams with the next-best records regardless of division.

The first MLL Championship Game saw the Long Island Lizards beat the Baltimore Bayhawks 15–11 in September 2001. The game was played at the John F. Kennedy Stadium in Bridgeport, Connecticut. Paul Gait was named the game's MVP.

Four out of the first five championship games were between the Long Island Lizards and the Baltimore Bayhawks. The Lizards won titles in 2001 and 2003, while the Bayhawks won in 2002 and 2005. The recently relocated Philadelphia Barrage beat the Boston Cannons 13–11 in 2004's final.

In 2003, New Balance became a "founding member" and major sponsor of MLL. New Balance founder and CEO, Jim Davis got very involved in the operation of the league, including providing financial support. Davis still owns the Dallas Rattlers.

In 2005, Andrew Goldstein became the first American male team-sport professional athlete to be openly gay during his playing career. Goldstein played goalie for the Long Island Lizards from 2005 to 2007, although he only appeared in two games in 2006.

=== Expansion and contraction (2006–2011) ===
MLL added four teams for the 2006 season, bringing the league's number of teams up to ten. The expansion markets were Los Angeles, Denver, Chicago, and San Francisco, extending the league across the country and into top media markets. MLL combined the original six teams into the Eastern Conference and put the new teams into the Western Conference.

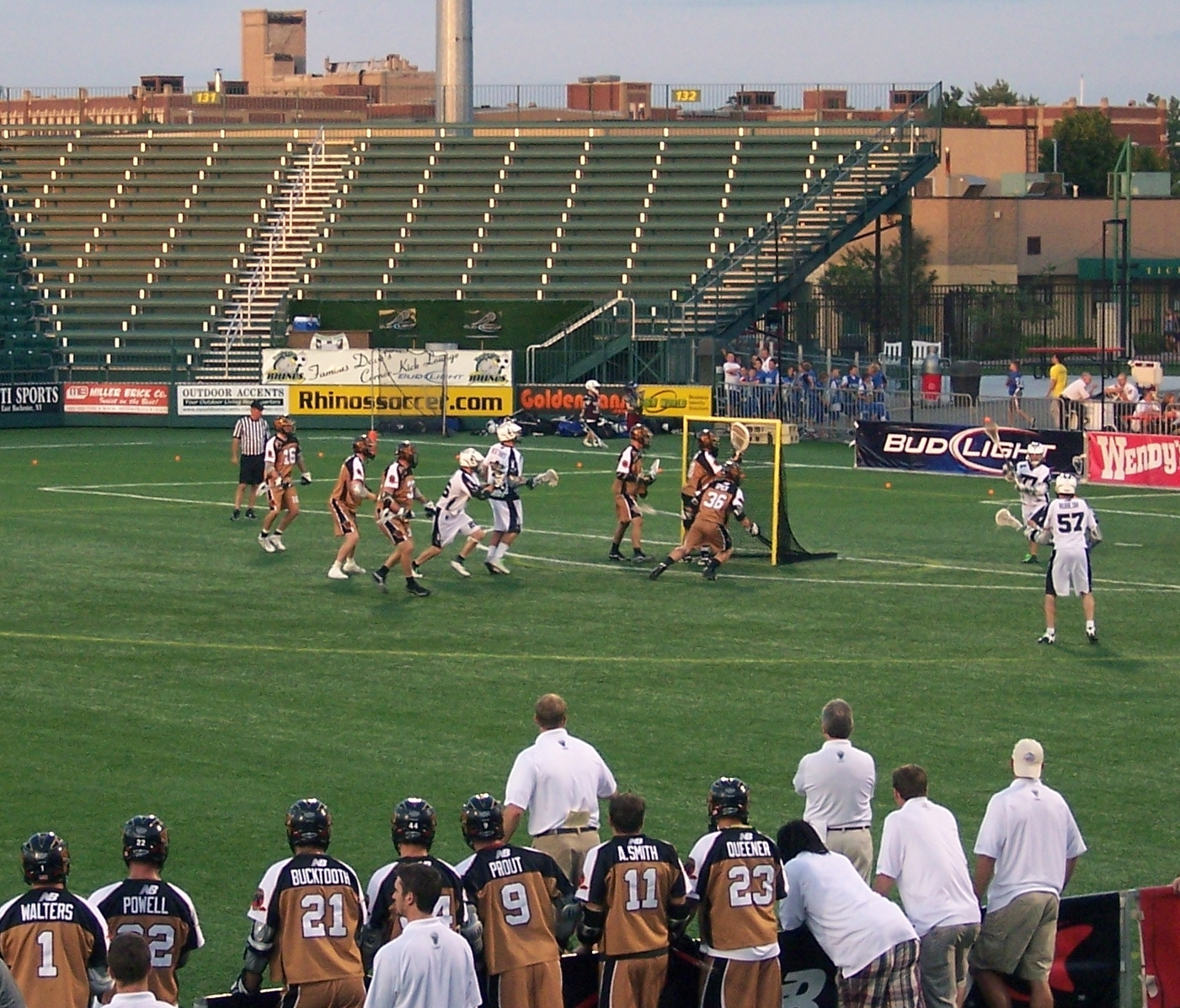
Lizards at Rattlers in 2008

The Los Angeles Riptide were owned by the Anschutz Entertainment Group and played its home games at the Home Depot Center. Denver Broncos' owner Pat Bowlen brought the Denver Outlaws to an NFL stadium, Mile High. The other new franchises were the Chicago Machine and the San Francisco Dragons.

Despite winning championships in 2006 and 2007, Philadelphia didn't attract more than 2,500 fans to their games. So in 2008, the Barrage tested out new markets by playing all of its "home" matches in five other cities: Cary, North Carolina; Hillsboro, Oregon; Irving, Texas; St. Louis; and Virginia Beach. In addition, the Barrage's "home game" against the Cannons was played in Boston.

At the end of the 2008 season, four teams – Los Angeles, New Jersey, Philadelphia, and San Francisco – folded due to financial problems. Several of these teams suffered from poor attendance, San Francisco drew 2,808 per game and only 1,920 in New Jersey. This contraction forced the remaining six teams to form one conference.

The Rochester Rattlers won the 2008 Steinfeld Cup but like the Barrage, struggled at the gate. At the start of the 2009 season, a new ownership group in Toronto bought the rights to the Rochester franchise. The Toronto Nationals inherited the staff and players of the team, but the Rattlers' name and team colors were left in Rochester for the possibility of a future team. That same group of players went on to win another championship in 2009 playing for a different team in a different country.

The Chicago Machine played the entire 2010 season as a traveling team testing expansion markets for the league, before deciding that the franchise would be moving to Rochester and adopting the Rattlers name in 2011.

In 2010, the Bayhawks and Lizards met for the fifth time in the championship game. The Bayhawks prevailed 13–9, almost the same score as when they beat Long Island 15–9 five years earlier. The newly renamed Chesapeake Bayhawks went on to win two more championships in the next three years, in 2012 and 2013. Their five Steinfeld Cup trophies are the most in MLL history.

The league's attendance peaked at 6,417 per game in the 2011 season. The individual franchises had a wide range of local support. Denver lead the league in attendance, drawing 12,331 fans per game in 2011, while the relocated Hamilton Nationals had 1,214 people per game, one-tenth of Denver's attendance.

=== LXM Pro Tour ===
In late 2009, Kyle Harrison, Scott Hochstadt, Craig Hochstadt, Xander Ritz, and Max Ritz formed the LXM Pro Tour. The tour would feature two teams playing games across the country at special events involving the LXM Pro game and youth activities. The tour competed for players with the MLL as the more established league would not let players under contract play in other professional lacrosse events.

On February 13, 2014, MLL announced a partnership with the LXM Pro Tour, a week after the league announced a new equipment deal with STX, a sponsor of one of the LXM Pro teams. The deal moved LXM to the MLL off-season and allowed players to participate in both MLL and LXM. However, LXM Pro didn't hold any tour stops after the announcement.

=== Southern trend (2012–2018) ===
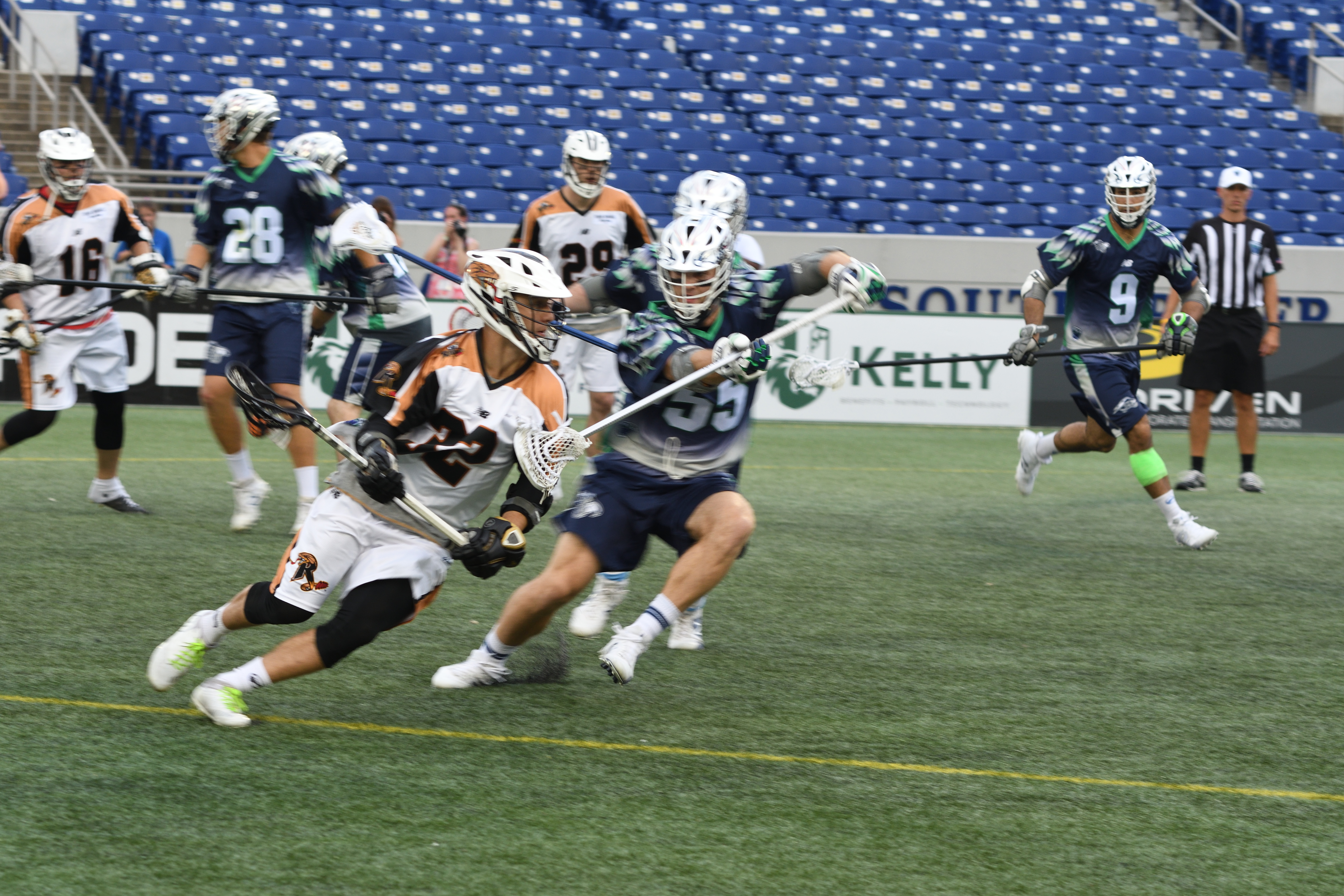
Jordan Wolf dodging vs. Chesapeake Bayhawks in 2017

During the early years of MLL, the league did not have any teams in the southeast. In January 2011, Commissioner David Gross announced that Charlotte, North Carolina, as well as Columbus, Ohio, were granted expansion teams for the 2012 season. The Ohio Machine and Charlotte Hounds opened play in April 2012, with both teams missing the playoffs in their inaugural season. With the expansion, the league grew to eight teams and expanded its schedule to fourteen games.

In November 2013, the Hamilton Nationals folded and an expansion franchise was awarded to the Florida Launch for the 2014 season. The Launch inherited the Nationals roster. The Atlanta Blaze became the ninth MLL team in 2016. The Rattlers relocated [again] from Rochester, New York, in 2018 to Dallas, Texas, and began play as the Dallas Rattlers in 2018.

=== Second contraction (2019 to 2020) ===
On April 1, 2019, just two months before the start of the season, the league announced that the Charlotte Hounds, Florida Launch, and Ohio Machine would not be playing in 2019. While the Hounds announced they would be back in 2021 under new ownership in a renovated stadium, the Launch and Machine effectively folded. The announcement dropped the league down to six teams, the fewest teams since 2011, and meant all remaining owners owned only one team. Jim Davis, owner of New Balance, had owned the Hounds, Launch, and Machine, but he now owns only the Dallas Rattlers.

Returning from a two-year retirement, 44-year-old John Grant Jr. broke the record for career points scored during the 2019 season. Also in 2019, MLL saw its first goal by a Japanese player, Kohta Kurashima, who is also the first Japanese born player in MLL history. The Rattlers ceased operations after the 2019 season. and the staff and roster were shifted to an expansion team called the Connecticut Hammerheads. The Atlanta Blaze also ceased operations after the 2019 season and were replaced by a resurrected Philadelphia Barrage. Due to the COVID-19 pandemic, the league announced they would play a week-long quarantined season in Annapolis at Navy-Marine Corps Memorial Stadium with no fans. Every team would play each other once (five total games) before a four-team playoff as normal.

=== PLL merger (2020) ===
On December 16, 2020, it was announced that the MLL had agreed to merge all operations with the Premier Lacrosse League. Under this agreement, the leagues will operate as one under the "PLL" brand and model. In order to accommodate the influx of players the PLL will be expanding the league to include its eighth touring team, known as Cannons Lacrosse Club, paying homage to the 2020 MLL champions, the Boston Cannons. The roster of this new team was determined by the 2021 expansion draft.

== Rules ==
A Major League Lacrosse Field is 110 yards long and 60 yards wide. The game is 60 minutes long, divided into four 15-minute quarters with 15-minute intermission at halftime, plus multiple 10-minute golden goal periods for regulation games ending in ties unless one team scores, which wins the game. Teams are required to dress twenty players, with ten players on the field at a time. MLL rules are based on NCAA rules with various changes. The most significant are a two-point goal line 16 yards (15 m) from each goal, a 60-second shot clock, the elimination of the restraining box, and allowing dive shots. The shot clock was originally 45 seconds before it was changed to 60 seconds for the 2005 season. From the inception of the league to 2008, there was a limit of three long-stick defensemen per team in order to promote scoring. Beginning in 2009, the league conformed to high school and college lacrosse rules and now allows four long–sticks per team on the field at any one time. 20 players dress for each regular-season game.

== Teams ==
Team	City	First season	Last season	Notes
Atlanta Blaze	Atlanta, Georgia	2016	2019	
Boston Cannons	Quincy, Massachusetts	2001	2020	The team joined the Premier Lacrosse League and was renamed to Cannons Lacrosse Club until returning to Boston when the PLL announced home cities for each team.
Charlotte Hounds	Charlotte, North Carolina	2012	2018	Inactive for 2019 and 2020 seasons
Chesapeake Bayhawks	Annapolis, Maryland	2001	2020	Baltimore Bayhawks 2001–2006, Washington Bayhawks 2007–2009
Chicago Machine	Bridgeview, Illinois	2006	2010	Played final season as a traveling team
Connecticut Hammerheads	Fairfield, Connecticut	2020	2020	
Dallas Rattlers	Frisco, Texas	2001	2019	Originally Rochester Rattlers 2001–2008 and 2011–2017
Denver Outlaws	Denver, Colorado	2006	2020	Revived as a Premier Lacrosse League team in November 2023 as a result of Chrome Lacrosse Club rebranding.
Florida Launch	Boca Raton, Florida	2014	2018	
Hamilton Nationals	Hamilton, Ontario	2009	2013	Toronto Nationals 2009–2010
Los Angeles Riptide	Carson, California	2006	2008	
New Jersey Pride	Piscataway, New Jersey	2001	2008	Also played in Montclair and Bridgewater
New York Lizards	Hempstead, New York	2001	2020	Long Island Lizards 2001–2012
Ohio Machine	Columbus, Ohio	2012	2018	
Philadelphia Barrage	Philadelphia, Pennsylvania	2001	2020	Bridgeport Barrage 2001–2003, Inactive 2009–2019
San Francisco Dragons	San Francisco, California	2006	2008	Played final season in San Jose

== Championship games ==
The MLL Championship Game was played at a neutral site decided by the league. Teams qualified for the playoffs by finishing with one of the top four records during the regular season. Those four teams played in a semifinal to determine who plays in the Championship Game.

Season	Champion	Score	Runner-up	Venue	Location	Attendance	Game MVP
2001	Long Island Lizards	15–11	Baltimore Bayhawks	Kennedy Stadium	Bridgeport, CT	6,745	Paul Gait
2002	Baltimore Bayhawks	21–13	Long Island Lizards	Columbus Crew Stadium	Columbus, OH	5,596	Mark Millon
2003	Long Island Lizards	15–14 (OT)	Baltimore Bayhawks	Villanova Stadium	Villanova, PA	6,593	Kevin Lowe
2004	Philadelphia Barrage	13–11	Boston Cannons	Nickerson Field	Boston, MA	8,279	Greg Cattrano
2005	Baltimore Bayhawks	15–9	Long Island Lizards	Nickerson Field	Boston, MA	6,829	Gary Gait
2006	Philadelphia Barrage	23–12	Denver Outlaws	The Home Depot Center	Carson, CA	5,374	Roy Colsey
2007	Philadelphia Barrage	16–13	Los Angeles Riptide	PAETEC Park	Rochester, NY	5,288	Matt Striebel
2008	Rochester Rattlers	16–6	Denver Outlaws	Harvard Stadium	Boston, MA	8,481	Joe Walters
2009	Toronto Nationals	10–9	Denver Outlaws	Navy–Marine Corps Memorial Stadium	Annapolis, MD	7,003	Merrick Thomson
2010	Chesapeake Bayhawks	13–9	Long Island Lizards	Navy–Marine Corps Memorial Stadium	Annapolis, MD	6,445	Kyle Hartzell
2011	Boston Cannons	10–9	Hamilton Nationals	Navy–Marine Corps Memorial Stadium	Annapolis, MD	5,027	Jordan Burke
2012	Chesapeake Bayhawks	16–6	Denver Outlaws	Harvard Stadium	Boston, MA	7,384	Ben Rubeor
2013	Chesapeake Bayhawks	10–9	Charlotte Hounds	PPL Park	Chester, PA	3,892	John Grant Jr.
2014	Denver Outlaws	12–11	Rochester Rattlers	Fifth Third Bank Stadium	Kennesaw, GA	8,149	John Grant Jr.
2015	New York Lizards	15–12	Rochester Rattlers	Fifth Third Bank Stadium	Kennesaw, GA	8,674	Paul Rabil
2016	Denver Outlaws	19–18	Ohio Machine	Fifth Third Bank Stadium	Kennesaw, GA	5,522	Eric Law
2017	Ohio Machine	17–12	Denver Outlaws	The Ford Center at The Star	Frisco, TX	7,543	Marcus Holman
2018	Denver Outlaws	16–12	Dallas Rattlers	MUSC Health Stadium	Charleston, SC	4,086	Matt Kavanagh
2019	Chesapeake Bayhawks	10–9	Denver Outlaws	Dick's Sporting Goods Park	Denver, CO	6,374	Steele Stanwick
2020	Boston Cannons	13–10	Denver Outlaws	Navy-Marine Corps Memorial Stadium	Annapolis, MD	No fans	Not awarded

=== Performance by team ===
Team	Champions	Runner up	Years
Chesapeake Bayhawks	6	2	2002, 2005, 2010, 2012, 2013, 2019
Denver Outlaws	3	7	2014, 2016, 2018
New York Lizards	3	3	2001, 2003, 2015
Philadelphia Barrage	3	0	2004, 2006, 2007
Boston Cannons	2	1	2011, 2020
Dallas Rattlers	1	3	2008
Toronto Nationals	1	1	2009
Ohio Machine	1	1	2017
Los Angeles Riptide	0	1	
Charlotte Hounds	0	1	

== Draft ==
Every year, Major League Lacrosse held a collegiate player draft. The collegiate player draft occurred prior to the league season. Only players who competed at the collegiate level and whose NCAA eligibility has expired in the previous season were eligible for the draft. The exact date, location, and number of rounds varied each year.

In addition, each off-season, MLL heald a supplemental player draft. The draft was held to expand a team's protected list to a pre-season active roster of 40 players. If a player wasn't selected, they returned to the player pool.

=== Top draft picks ===
Season	Date	Location	MLL Team	Player	Position	College
2001	June 1, 2001	Radisson Hotel at Cross Keys, Baltimore, MD	Rochester Rattlers	Ryan Mollett	Defense	Princeton
2002	June 2, 2002	Cawley Stadium, Lowell, MA	Rochester Rattlers	Josh Coffman	Midfielder	Syracuse
2003	May 29, 2003	The Haverford School, Haverford, PA	Bridgeport Barrage	Chris Rotelli	Midfielder	Virginia
2004	June 3, 2004	Sacred Heart University, Fairfield, CT	Baltimore Bayhawks	Michael Powell	Attack	Syracuse
2005	June 1, 2005	Sacred Heart University, Fairfield, CT	New Jersey Pride	Kyle Harrison	Midfielder	Johns Hopkins
2006	May 31, 2006	Sacred Heart University, Fairfield, CT	Rochester Rattlers	Joe Walters	Attack	Maryland
2007	May 31, 2007	Stony Brook University, Stony Brook, NY	Chicago Machine	Pat Heim	Midfielder	Penn State
2008	May 28, 2008	Stevens Institute of Technology, Hoboken, NJ	Boston Cannons	Paul Rabil	Midfielder	Johns Hopkins
2009	May 27, 2009	Stevens Institute of Technology, Hoboken, NJ	Chicago Machine	Kenny Nims	Attack	Syracuse
2010	June 6, 2010	Yale University, New Haven, CT	Chicago Machine	Ned Crotty	Attack	Duke
2011	January 21, 2011	Pratt Street Power Plant, Baltimore, MD	Hamilton Nationals	Kevin Crowley	Midfielder	Stony Brook
2012	January 13, 2012	Philadelphia Marriott's Liberty Ballroom, Philadelphia, PA	Long Island Lizards	Rob Pannell	Attack	Cornell
2013	January 11, 2013	Philadelphia Marriott's Liberty Ballroom, Philadelphia, PA	Ohio Machine	Peter Baum	Attack	Colgate
2014	January 10, 2014	Philadelphia Marriott's Liberty Ballroom, Philadelphia, PA	Ohio Machine	Tom Schreiber	Midfield	Princeton
2015	January 23, 2015	Baltimore Convention Center, Baltimore, MD	Florida Launch	Lyle Thompson	Attack	Albany
2016	January 22, 2016	Baltimore Convention Center, Baltimore, MD	Atlanta Blaze	Myles Jones	Midfield	Duke
2017	May 28, 2017	Toby Keith's Bar and Grill, Foxoborough, MA	Florida Launch	Dylan Molloy	Attack	Brown
2018	April 18, 2018	The U.S. Lacrosse Headquarters, Sparks, Maryland	Boston Cannons	Trevor Baptiste	Midfield	Denver
2019	March 8, 2019	NASCAR Hall of Fame, Charlotte, North Carolina	Ohio Machine	Alex Woodall	Face-off	Towson
2020	May 4, 2020	Virtual	New York Lizards	TD Ierlan	Face-off	Yale

== Attendance ==
From 2006, overall league attendance varied between 3,800 and 6,500 per game, peaking in 2011 and steadily decreasing to an all-time low in 2018. There had always been a great deal of disparity in attendance figures for different teams in the league. Playing at Invesco Field at Mile High, the Denver Outlaws had led the league in attendance all but one year of their existence. A significant portion of Denver's attendance was from one game each year. The Outlaws established a tradition of having a game on the Fourth of July that always attracted the biggest single-game attendance in the league. 31,644 people attended the game and watched fireworks afterward in 2015. The Fourth of July game regularly attracted over 25,000 people. Outside of this special event game, Denver drew about 6,000 per game.

Season	Teams	Average attendance	High average	High Team	Low average	Low Team	Ref
2006	10	4,295	11,634	Denver	2,202	Chicago	
2007	10	4,429	10,592	Denver	2,243	Chicago	
2008	10	4,515	10,853	Denver	1,920	New Jersey	
2009	6	5,557	10,127	Denver	2,569	Chicago	
2010	6	5,278	10,778	Denver	2,729	Toronto	
2011	6	6,417	12,331	Denver	1,214	Hamilton	
2012	8	5,609	9,648	Boston	1,838	Hamilton	
2013	8	5,069	9,466	Denver	1,991	Rochester	
2014	8	4,759	10,383	Denver	1,204	Florida	
2015	8	4,384	9,502	Denver	1,187	Rochester	
2016	9	4,268	9,390	Denver	1,456	Rochester	
2017	9	3,844	9,212	Denver	1,586	Charlotte	
2018	9	3,619	7,758	Denver	1,364	Charlotte	
2019	6	4,587	7,145	Chesapeake	1,739	Atlanta	
2020	6	0	0	n/a	0	n/a	

== League operations ==
The league was owned by Major League Lacrosse, LLC, which was controlled by the founders and the six franchises. The founders – Steinfeld, Morrow, Robertson, and Davis – control five of 14 ownership shares (36%); the nine franchises each had one ownership share (7%). Davis owned two of the nine franchises and has a stake in two others.

Atlanta Blaze owner Peter Trematerra sued Major League Lacrosse, LLC, Commissioner Gross, Jim Davis and several businesses controlled by the founders of the league in April 2017. Trematerra alleged that Gross provided inaccurate information about the profitability of the league in 2014, when Trematerra was considering buying an expansion franchise. The suit also claimed that because the league, some of its major sponsors, and Lax Sports Network were all controlled by the same people and entities, sponsorship and broadcast rights were sold for below market value.

In August 2017, the MLL accidentally exposed the confidential personal information of over 1,000 players, nearly everyone who has ever played in the league or tried out for a team. The information was stored in one excel spreadsheet that was publicly linked on the league's website for a day. It is unknown if any player experienced identity theft as a result of the incident.

League leadership
Name	Years	Title
Gabby Roe	1999–2002	Executive Director
Matthew Pace	2002–2003	Executive Director
David Gross	2003–2004	Chief Operating Officer
David Gross	2004–2018	Commissioner
Alexander "Sandy" Brown	2018–2020	Commissioner

Headquarters:

- East Rutherford, New Jersey (1999–2001)
- Secaucus, New Jersey (2001–2004)
- Boston, Massachusetts (2004–2020)

== Television coverage ==
Fox Sports Network broadcast games for the first two seasons, then ESPN2 televised a weekly MLL game from 2003 through 2011. In 2012, ESPN2 televised three regular season games, the All-Star Game, one semifinal, and the MLL Championship game. MLL games have not been regularly shown on ESPN2 since 2012 due to low ratings. Games continue to be streamed on ESPN3. CBS Sports Network has televised all-star games and the playoffs since 2013. MLL did not receive any money from these networks for these deals.

In 2017, Lax Sports Network was given exclusive rights to all 63 regular season games. Twitter streamed the semifinal games and CBS Sports Network broadcast the final.

On April 1, 2019, the league announced they had reacquired broadcast rights from Lax Sports Network. It was unclear where each team would broadcast its games, though the Cannons announced on March 28 that NBC Sports Boston would air all 16 of their games.

One day prior to the start of the 2019 season, the league announced that 12 games would be broadcast on Stadium and the network would air a weekly studio show.

Also in 2019, MLL re-partnered with the ESPN network. Weekly coverage was shown on ESPN+ and several games, including the league championship, were broadcast nationally on ESPN2. MLL saw their biggest television-reach in league history. The semi-finals and finals combined for 297 million total household viewers.

Major League Lacrosse would expand its relationship with ESPN for the COVID-19-shortened 2020 season. All 18 games (including postseason) were available on the ESPN family of networks, including ESPN+. ESPN2 broadcast two games on Sunday, July 19. A few days later, the partnership was expanded to TSN for Canadian viewers and ESPN Player to allow fans to watch from over 130 countries. The championship game was broadcast on ESPN's flagship station on Sunday, July 26.
