= Kentucky Stickhorses =

- Founded: 2011
- Folded: 2013
- Based in: Louisville, Kentucky
- Arena: Freedom Hall
- Colors: Black, gold, silver, white
- Owner: Anthony Chase
- Head coach: Pete Schroeder
- General manager: Kristin Nelson
- Website: kentuckystickhorses.com

The Kentucky Stickhorses were an American indoor lacrosse team based in Louisville, Kentucky. They were formerly a member of the North American Lacrosse League, before the league's demise after the 2013 season. The Stickhorses played their home games at Freedom Hall.

== History ==
=== Founding and the NALL era ===
The franchise was announced as the fourth of five founding members of the North American Lacrosse League on September 26, 2011, joining the Charlotte Copperheads, Hershey Haymakers, Jacksonville Bullies, and the Wilkes-Barre/Scranton Shamrocks for the inaugural season. However, the league faced legal troubles before playing a single game and split, with the other four members forming the new Professional Lacrosse League. This left the Stickhorses to play an exhibition season in 2012, with all the games being hosted at Freedom Hall.

Reorganized, the NALL returned for the 2013 season with three new full-time members, the Boston Rockhoppers (who participated in two games of the 2012 exhibition season), Baltimore Bombers, and the Rhode Island Kingfish. The league was eager to finally get things going with their first normal season, and the first season where the league was housed in more than one venue. Kentucky struggled in the regular season, posting a 2–6 record, but still found themselves taking on the Rockhoppers in the first ever league championship.

The Stickhorses fell to Boston in a blowout, 26–13, to end the year. However, the league wasn't past all the roadblocks. The Kingfish lost their home arena deal, while the Bombers folded from the league mid-season. The first ever season ended with the league still hanging in the balance. On June 18, 2013, it was official; the NALL had disbanded. Stickhorses owner Anthony Chase wrote an open letter to the fans announcing the end of the team, citing a lack of resources, but hoping that his and the fans' "paths will cross again someday soon."

== Roster ==
2013 Kentucky Stickhorses
Number	Name	Position	College	Height	Weight
1	Patrick Crosby	G	Temple	5 ft 10 in	170 lbs
2	Spencer Lyons		Onondaga CC	5 ft 10 in	225 lbs
4	Devin Clifford	D	Colgate	6 ft 0 in	190 lbs
9	Max Schmidt	T	Maryland	6 ft 4 in	210 lbs
10	Stefan Schroder		Ohio State	6 ft 0 in	180 lbs
11	Joel Derechinsky	F	Gordon College	5 ft 11 in	185 lbs
12	George Castle		Johns Hopkins	6 ft 1 in	180 lbs
13	Brandon Dube	F	Endicott	5 ft 10 in	190 lbs
14	Josh Kacprzack		NYIT	6 ft 3 in	220 lbs
15	Tim McCormack		UMass	6 ft 0 in	205 lbs
16	Ed Prevost	F	UNC	6 ft 0 in	180 lbs
17	Ryan Maciaszek	T	Nazareth College	6 ft 1 in	210 lbs
18	Mike Unterstein	T	Hofstra	5 ft 11 in	200 lbs
20	Dave Lisi	D	Wheeling Jesuit	6 ft 5 in	248 lbs
21	Eric O'Brien	T	Ohio State	6 ft 5 in	220 lbs
22	Jake Davis		Florida Atlantic	5 ft 11 in	175 lbs
23	Dave McCarthy	T	Albany	5 ft 11 in	175 lbs
24	Mike McLellan		Mercyhurst	6 ft 2 in	190 lbs
28	Brian Caufield	F	UAlbany	6 ft 4 in	225 lbs
29	Arthur Kell	T	UMass Amherst	6 ft 1 in	220 lbs
34	Anthony Kelly	D	Ohio State	6 ft 4 in	255 lbs
44	Greg Bice	T	Ohio State	6 ft 3 in	220 lbs

== 2013 season ==
2013 Kentucky Stickhorses season
Date & time	Away team	Score	Home team	Score	Game notes
January 5 @ 7:00 PM	Boston Rockhoppers	10	Kentucky	9
January 12 @ 7:00 PM	Rhode Island Kingfish	14	Kentucky	17
January 19 @ 7:00 PM	Kentucky	9	Boston Rockhoppers	16
February 1 @ 7:00 PM	Baltimore Bombers	17	Kentucky	13
February 3 @ 1:00 PM	Baltimore Bombers	10	Kentucky	11	Overtime
February 24 @ 3:00 PM	Kentucky	10	Baltimore Bombers	12
March 2 @ 7:00 PM	Boston Rockhoppers	16	Kentucky	13
March 9 @ 7:00 PM	Kentucky	TBP	Boston Rockhoppers	TBP
March 10 @ 3:00 PM✝	Kentucky	N/A	Baltimore Bombers	N/A	CANCELED
March 16 @ 7:00 PM✝	Rhode Island Kingfish	N/A	Kentucky	N/A	CANCELED

✝ Games canceled due to Baltimore Bombers mid-season fold.

== Season-by-season ==
Year	Reg. season	Playoffs	Attendance average
2012†	N/A	N/A	N/A
2013		TBD	TBD

† 2012 was only an exhibition season.

== See also ==
- Sports in Louisville, Kentucky
