= 2013 North American Lacrosse League season =

2013 NALL season
- League: North American Lacrosse League
- Sport: Indoor lacrosse
- Duration: January 5, 2013 – March 16, 2013
- Teams: 4
- Finals champions: Boston Rockhoppers
- Runners-up: Kentucky Stickhorses
- Finals MVP: Mike Stone

NALL seasons

The 2013 North American Lacrosse League season was the first and only season in the history of the NALL. The season began January 5, 2013 and ended March 16, 2013. Originally scheduled as a 12-game season for each team, the season was cut to ten games for the Baltimore Bombers, Boston Rockhoppers and Kentucky Stickhorses. The Rhode Island Kingfish season was initially cut to 6 road games due to issues securing the Bradford R. Boss Arena. Eventually, due to the Bombers folding after only seven games, the rest of the regular season was canceled on March 11, and the championship game was moved to March 16.

== Season Table ==
Abbreviation and Color Key: Baltimore Bombers – BAL • Boston Rockhoppers – BOS• Kentucky Stickhorses – KEN • Rhode Island Kingfish – RI Win • Loss • Home
Team	Game									
Team	1	2	3	4	5	6	7	8	9	10
Baltimore Bombers	BOS	RI	BOS	KEN	KEN	RI	BOS	KEN	KEN	BOS
Baltimore Bombers	17–16/OT	12–8	9–20	17–13	10–11/OT	CANCELED	9–18	12–10	CANCELED	CANCELED
Boston Rockhoppers	KEN	BAL	KEN	BAL	RI	BAL	KEN	RI	KEN	BAL
Boston Rockhoppers	10–9	16–17/OT	16–9	20–9	20–7	18–9	16–13	15–14	CANCELED	CANCELED
Kentucky Stickhorses	BOS	RI	BOS	BAL	BAL	BAL	BOS	BOS	BAL	RI
Kentucky Stickhorses	9–10	17–14	9–16	13–17	11–10/OT	10–12	13–16	CANCELED	CANCELED	CANCELED
Rhode Island Kingfish	KEN	BAL	BOS	BAL	BOS	KEN	n/a	n/a	n/a	n/a
Rhode Island Kingfish	14–17	8–12	7–20	CANCELED	14–15	CANCELED	n/a	n/a	n/a	n/a

== Current standings ==
Grey indicated that the Baltimore Bombers folded before the season completed. Record shown is their record before they folded.

Rank	Team	GP	W	L	PCT	Home	Away	PF	PA	+/-	GB
1	Boston Rockhoppers	8	7	1	.857	3–1	4–0	131	87	+44	--
2	Kentucky Stickhorses	7	2	5	.400	2–4	0–2	71	85	-14	4.5
3	Rhode Island Kingfish	4	0	4	.000	N/A	0–3	43	64	-21	5
X	Baltimore Bombers	7	4	3	.750	2–2	2–1	86	96	-10	N/A

== Milestones & events ==
=== Preseason ===
- The first league sponsored combine was held on October 13, 2012.
- Due to the impact of Hurricane Sandy, the 2012 player draft, originally scheduled for October 29, 2012, was postponed until November 1, 2012.

=== Regular season ===
- The first overtime game was between the Baltimore Bombers and Boston Rockhoppers on January 12. The Bombers won 17–16, which was their first win in franchise history.
- The February 9 game between the Baltimore Bombers and Rhode Island Kingfish was postponed due to Winter Storm Nemo.
- For a second time in the 2013, a game featuring the Rhode Island Kingfish was postponed due to a snow storm. The February 23 game between the Rhode Island Kingfish and Boston Rockhoppers will be played March 9.
- On March 8, 2013 it was officially reported the Baltimore Bombers had folded. General manager and head coach, Hunter Francis noted that "...the economics didn’t work." This news initially broke on Laxdirt.com and later on their Facebook page. Just two days before, the Bombers posted about giveaway at the game scheduled for March 10.
- On March 11, the Kentucky Stickhorses created an event page on Facebook stating they would take on the Boston Rockhoppers in the 2013 NALL Championship on March 16 at Freedom Hall. This move canceled the few remaining games left in the season and moved the NALL finals a week earlier than scheduled.

== Championship ==
Saturday, March 16, 2013 at 7:00PM EST, at Freedom Hall in Louisville, Kentucky

Seed	Team	Q1	Q2	Q3	Q4	Final
1	Boston Rockhoppers	4	9	8	4	25
2	Kentucky Stickhorses	3	3	3	4	13

== See also ==
- 2013 in sports
