= Sports in Jacksonville =

Jacksonville is home to a number of professional sports teams, and the city has a long history of athletics. The Jacksonville Jaguars of the National Football League (NFL) compete at the major league level. Additionally, the PGA Tour is headquartered in the suburb of Ponte Vedra Beach, where it hosts The Players Championship every year. All Elite Wrestling, the second-largest professional wrestling promotion in the U.S. behind WWE, has its headquarters in the Jaguars' stadium, largely due to its shared ownership with the Jaguars.

In addition, Jacksonville has a number of minor league and semiprofessional sports teams. These include the Jacksonville Armada FC, Jacksonville Jumbo Shrimp baseball team, the Jacksonville Icemen ice hockey team, the Jacksonville Sharks indoor football team, the Jacksonville Axemen rugby league team, and the Jacksonville Giants basketball team.

Jacksonville is also home to two universities, Jacksonville University and the University of North Florida, which compete in NCAA Division I. Several college sporting events are also held in Jacksonville annually.

== Professional sports ==
Jacksonville is home to one major league professional team — the Jacksonville Jaguars of the National Football League — and several minor league teams.

Club	Sport	League	Venue
Jacksonville Jaguars	Football	National Football League	EverBank Stadium (67,246)
Sporting Club Jacksonville	Soccer	USL Championship	TBD
Jacksonville Jumbo Shrimp	Baseball	International League	121 Financial Ballpark (11,000)
Jacksonville Icemen	Ice hockey	ECHL	VyStar Veterans Memorial Arena (13,141)
Jacksonville Sharks	Indoor football	Indoor Football League	VyStar Veterans Memorial Arena (13,011)
Jacksonville Armada	Soccer	MLS Next Pro	TBD

=== American football ===
Football is by far the most popular sport in the Jacksonville area. The city is home to the Jacksonville Jaguars of the National Football League (NFL). The only major league-level sports team to play in Jacksonville, the Jaguars currently play in South Division of the NFL's American Football Conference (AFC).

The Jaguars joined the NFL as an expansion team in 1995, along with the Carolina Panthers. In 1990, the NFL had announced it would expand by two teams, and Jacksonville entered the bidding war. Jacksonville was the smallest market among the bidders, and was considered the unlikeliest choice. However, in 1993, after a series of negotiations, the NFL announced that the second franchise would go to Jacksonville. The Jacksonville Jaguars play at TIAA Bank Field in downtown Jacksonville. The Jaguars have won five division championships, in 1998, 1999, 2017, 2022, and 2025 and they have made nine playoff appearances.

Jacksonville hosted Super Bowl XXXIX in 2005. As the smallest metropolitan area to ever host a Super Bowl, special accommodations were necessary, such as the use of cruise ships as hotels.

Jacksonville also has a number of amateur football teams, including the Jacksonville Dixie Blues, a women's football team in the Women's Football Alliance, and the Jacksonville Knights of the Florida Football Alliance.

==== Expansion efforts: 1960s–1980s ====
The success of college football led to interest in bringing professional football to Jacksonville, which began in earnest in the 1960s. In 1966, the New York Jets and the expansion Miami Dolphins played an exhibition game in the Gator Bowl, and this was followed by preseason games with the Boston Patriots facing the Miami Dolphins in 1968 and the Denver Broncos in 1969. In 1967 and 1968, the city hosted the American Football League All Star Game at the Gator Bowl. Jacksonville was the only non-AFL city to host the game. It was presumed at the time that this was a prelude to Jacksonville getting an AFL expansion team, but when the AFL merged with the rival NFL in 1970 expansion plans were scrapped. The city also hosted a number of NFL preseason games throughout the 70s and 80s.

Jacksonville's first attempt at professional football came in 1926, when former Stanford University star Ernie Nevers organized the Jacksonville All-Stars to play exhibition games against traveling NFL opponents. The All-Stars faced the Chicago Cardinals and their star Red Grange on January 2, and the New York Giants on January 9; however, both games drew meager crowds, and the All-Stars subsequently ended operations. Jacksonville had its first professional football team in 1974 with the Jacksonville Sharks of the World Football League, a short-lived attempt to establish a rival to the NFL. The Sharks' financial troubles led the league to fold the team; the franchise was revived the following year as the Jacksonville Express. However, the WFL folded before the end of the 1975 season. The Jacksonville Firebirds played in the American Football Association, a spring minor league, for three seasons, 1979–1981. In 1984 professional football returned with the Jacksonville Bulls of the United States Football League (USFL). The Bulls set many USFL attendance records, including the only two sell-out games; however the league ceased operations after the 1985 season.

The success of these earlier attempts generated interest in bringing the NFL to Jacksonville. Several NFL teams discussed moving to the city over the years, with the Baltimore Colts and the Houston Oilers making the most serious offers.

=== Baseball ===
Minor League Baseball has been played in Jacksonville nearly every year since the early 20th century. The city's current team are the Jacksonville Jumbo Shrimp, who currently play in International League since 2021. Two teams named the Suns have played in Jacksonville since 1962: A class Triple-A International League team from 1962–1968, and a Double-A team (renamed to the Jumbo Shrimp in 2017) from 1970 to 2020. They play at 121 Financial Ballpark in Downtown Jacksonville.

=== Hockey ===
Ice hockey returned to the city in 2017 when the Jacksonville Icemen of the ECHL were announced for the 2017–18 season. The team came from Evansville, Indiana, after a one-year hiatus and is the second ECHL team for the city of Jacksonville after the Jacksonville Lizard Kings ceased operations in 2000. The Jacksonville Icemen are the sixth hockey team to be based out of Jacksonville, with the historical list of teams in order of presence in the city being the Jacksonville Rockets from 1964 to 1972, the Cleveland Barons (1937–1973) for the 1972-73 AHL season, the Jacksonville Bullets from 1992 to 1996, the Jacksonville Lizard Kings from 1995 to 2000, and the Jacksonville Barracudas from 2002 to 2008.

=== Indoor football ===
Jacksonville is home to the Jacksonville Sharks, an indoor football team, who started play in 2010. From 2010 to 2016, the Sharks played in the Arena Football League (AFL), the top indoor football league in the United States. They left the league prior to the 2017 season and joined the National Arena League, a newly formed league with no association with the Arena Football League. The city was previously home to the Jacksonville Tomcats, who played in af2, the AFL's developmental league, from 2000 to 2002, at which point the old Jacksonville Coliseum was demolished to make way for the current arena.

The Sharks won one AFL championship, defeating the Arizona Rattlers 73–70 in Arena Bowl XXIV.

=== Soccer ===
Sporting Club Jacksonville is an American professional soccer club located in Jacksonville, Florida. The club debuted in the USL Championship in 2025.

The Jacksonville Armada FC is Jacksonville's professional soccer team who began play in 2015 as an expansion team in the North American Soccer League (NASL), which was the second tier in the American soccer pyramid at that time. As of 2016, U.S. Men's National Team's Tony Meola took on the role of head coach. The Armada used to played their home games at University of North Florida at the Hodges Stadium in Jacksonville. After the 2017 season, the NASL ceased operations and the Armada temporarily joined the amateur National Premier Soccer League while looking for another professional league. The team then went on hiatus after the 2018 season. They are set to resume play in MLS Next Pro league in 2025.

=== Golf and tennis ===
The Greater Jacksonville area is at the top level of professional golf. The PGA Tour is headquartered in the suburb of Ponte Vedra Beach, where it hosts The Players Championship every year. The championship is one of the major stops on the PGA Tour, and is regarded as the most prestigious non-major tournament on the tour. St. Johns County is also home to the World Golf Village and the World Golf Hall of Fame. The Jacksonville area has around 64 golf courses, of which 18 are public, 18 are semi-private, 15 are private and 13 are resort courses. Several PGA Tour players make the Jacksonville area their year-round home.

Professional tennis is in town each year when the Women's Tennis Association (WTA) holds the Bausch & Lomb Championships at Amelia Island Plantation near Fernandina Beach, just north of Jacksonville. Additionally, the Association of Tennis Professionals (ATP) has its American headquarters in Ponte Vedra Beach.

== Semi-pro and amateur sports ==
=== Australian Rules Football ===
The Jacksonville Saints were formed in 2018. They train at Alexandria Oaks Park in San Marco and play matches at Willowbranch Park in Riverside. In 2021 they won the inaugural Florida Cup and the Magnolia Cup.

=== Basketball ===
The Jacksonville 95ers have played in The Basketball League (TBL) since 2024. They play their home games at Edward Waters University.

=== Rugby league ===
Rugby league football, has a unique presence in Jacksonville. The Jacksonville Axemen, founded in 2006, are one of the most successful rugby league football teams in the United States, both on and off the field. They currently play in the new USA Rugby League. They previously played in the American National Rugby League (AMRNL) from 2006–2010, advancing to the playoffs four times in five years and winning the championship in 2010. Beginning in 2011, the Axemen oversee a reserve grade competition, the Southeastern Rugby League Championship, contested by three feeder teams, including the Jacksonville Hatchets.

The Axemen play at Hodges Stadium at the University of North Florida, which has also hosted a number of international matches and training camps. UNF hosted the Rugby League Atlantic Cup, a tournament between emerging rugby league nations in North America, in 2009 and 2010. In 2008 the school hosted the "Australia Day Challenge" between the South Sydney Rabbitohs and the Leeds Rhinos, which featured Rabbitohs co-owner Russell Crowe and drew nearly 13,000 spectators. The New Zealand Police Rugby League team has also played at UNF against both the Axemen and a South Eastern Rugby League team. The Axemen began fielding a women's side in 2021 and have had players represent the US on the national side in 2022.

=== Rugby union ===
There are multiple amateur rugby union clubs in the city. Jacksonville Women's Rugby Club was founded in 2006 and have played women's division 2 since its founding. The men's team, Jacksonville Rugby Football Club was founded in 1972 and play FL division 3. The UNF Deadbirds is a club team at the University of North Florida, consisting of UNF students and other college students in the area. The HS U19 boys side won the state championship in 2019.

=== Soccer ===
The Jacksonville Armada U-23 is an amateur soccer team in the National Premier Soccer League. The team originated as the Jacksonville United FC in 2011 and won the 2011 NPSL Championship. In 2016, the United were replaced by the development team for the professional Jacksonville Armada FC. The U-23 team was temporarily replaced by Armada FC when that team took part in the 2018 season, but returned as the NPSL team in 2019 when the professional team suspended operations while looking for another league.

== College sports ==
The city has long supported college football. Florida's first college football game was held in Jacksonville in 1901, between Florida Agricultural College (a predecessor to the University of Florida) and Stetson College (now Stetson University). Jacksonville newspaper The Florida Times-Union recorded the state college championships and awarded the Championship Cup in the early years. The annual Florida–Georgia game between the University of Georgia Bulldogs and the University of Florida Gators has been played in the city nearly every year since 1933.

Jacksonville's football bowl game, the Gator Bowl, began in 1946. The Florida Gators and Georgia Bulldogs have played their annual football game, informally known as "The World's Largest Outdoor Cocktail Party", in Jacksonville every year since 1933, save a two-year hiatus caused by the razing of the Gator Bowl Stadium and construction of the venue now known as EverBank Stadium. The Florida State Seminoles have also held individual regular season games there, and in 1964 Georgia Tech and Navy played a regular season game there. The latter game was notable because 1963 Heisman Trophy winner and NFL Hall of Famer Roger Staubach played quarterback for Navy. Georgia Tech won the game 17-0. On September 2, 1989 Florida State played Southern Miss in the regular season opener at the Gator Bowl. Southern Miss quarterback and future NFL Hall of Famer Brett Favre led his team to a 30-26 upset of the heavily favored Seminoles.

Jacksonville was the host city for the Atlantic Coast Conference football championship games through 2007. In March 2006, Jacksonville was a host site for the first round of the NCAA Division I men's basketball tournament. The games were held at the Jacksonville Veterans Memorial Arena. The eventual national champion Florida Gators emerged from the Jacksonville regional.

Jacksonville's two universities, the University of North Florida (UNF) and Jacksonville University (JU), compete in NCAA Division I.

The University of North Florida's sports teams are known as the Ospreys. From 1993–2005 the Ospreys competed in NCAA Division II. In 2005 they began the transition to Division I, which was completed for the 2009 academic year. They are currently members of the Atlantic Sun Conference (ASUN). UNF's varsity sports are, in men's sports, baseball, basketball, cross country, soccer, track and field, tennis, and golf; and in women's sports, basketball, cross country, soccer, softball, swimming and diving, tennis, track and field, and volleyball. Women's golf was added in 2012.

Jacksonville University's sports teams are known as the Dolphins. The JU men's basketball team became notable in the early 1970s, when they made the NCAA Championship game with future American Basketball Association star Artis Gilmore. Like UNF they are members of the ASUN, a non-football league until the 2022–23 school year, for most sports; JU fielded a football team in the Division I FCS Pioneer Football League until shutting down the football program after the 2019 season. JU's varsity sports are, in men's sports, baseball, basketball, cross country, golf, lacrosse, rowing, soccer, and tennis; and in women's sports, basketball, cross country, golf, lacrosse, rowing, soccer, softball, tennis, track & field, and volleyball.

The Edward Waters Tigers, representing the historically black Edward Waters University, currently compete in the NCAA Division II Southern Intercollegiate Athletic Conference, a conference consisting mostly of historically black institutions. EWU started a transition from the NAIA in 2021. One EWU sport, men's volleyball, plays as a de facto Division I member; that sport has a single national championship event open to members of Divisions I and II.

Florida State College at Jacksonville BlueWave, members of the National Junior College Athletic Association (NJCAA) began competing in 1967 as the Florida Junior College Stars. Later the college became Florida Community College at Jacksonville and was later rebranded as Florida State College at Jacksonville FSCJ). FSCJ fields NJCAA DII teams: Men's and Women's Cross-Country, Men's and Women's Basketball, Men's Baseball, Women's Softball and Volleyball.

== Defunct teams ==
=== Baseball ===
Jacksonville hosted Major League Baseball's first-ever spring training in 1888, and hosted spring training camps for several teams through the early 20th century. According to the Baseball Almanac, the Philadelphia Athletics trained in Jacksonville in 1903 and 1914–1918, the Cincinnati Reds in 1905, the Boston Beaneaters (later Braves) in 1906, the Brooklyn Superbas (later Dodgers) in 1907–1909, the Brooklyn Robins (later Dodgers) in 1922, the Pittsburgh Pirates in 1918, and the New York Yankees in 1919–1920.

In 1904 the city got its first known professional minor league team, the Jacksonville Jays, who played in the South Atlantic League until 1910. Subsequent baseball teams that played in Jacksonville include the Jacksonville Tarpons (1911–1916), the Jacksonville Roses (1917), the Jacksonville Scouts (1921), and the Jacksonville Indians (1922). Beginning in 1926, a number of teams known as the Jacksonville Tars played in Jacksonville. The origin of this unusual name is unclear. The original Jacksonville Tars played in the Class B Southeastern League from 1926, following the city's acquisition of Durkee Field. They folded in 1930, and were replaced by a new Tars team in the South Atlantic League in 1936; except for three years during World War II, the team continued playing until 1952. During this time the Jacksonville Red Caps of the Negro leagues also played in Jacksonville for three seasons, in 1938 and 1941–1942.

In 1952 the Jacksonville Tars franchise was reorganized as the Jacksonville Braves. The Braves were much more successful on the field than the Tars had been. In 1961 an ownership switchup caused the Braves' major league affiliation to change; they were replaced by the Jacksonville Jets for the season. The original Jacksonville Suns team started play in 1962.

=== Basketball ===
Jacksonville previously has had a number of other basketball teams. The Floridians of the original American Basketball Association played some of their home games in Jacksonville in 1970 and 1971. Originally called the Miami Floridians, the team became a regional franchise for the 1970–1971 season, playing home games across the state in Jacksonville, South Florida, and the Tampa Bay area. Poor attendance caused the Floridians to drop Jacksonville and other cities from their schedule; due to their recurring financial issues the league disbanded the team in 1972, prior to the ABA–NBA merger of 1976.

Jacksonville has had a number of minor league-level basketball teams as well. Teams playing in Jacksonville have included the Jacksonville Jets (Continental Basketball Association, 1987); the Jacksonville Hooters, later the "Jacksonville Shooters", (United States Basketball League, 1990–1995); the Jacksonville Barracudas (USBL, 1996–1998), and the Jacksonville JAM (2006–2008). The Jacksonville Jam played one season in the American Basketball Association, from 2006–2007, and transferred to the rival Premier Basketball League the following season, where they were briefly known as the Jacksonville SLAM; however, they did not survive the transfer and folded before the end of the season.

The Jacksonville Giants played in the new American Basketball Association (ABA) from 2010 to 2022, capturing seven ABA championships. They played in the VyStar Veterans Memorial Arena.

=== Hockey ===
The city has had an intermittent history of minor league hockey since the 1960s. The city's first hockey team were the Jacksonville Rockets, who played in the Eastern Hockey League from 1964–1972. The city's other teams were the Jacksonville Barons (American Hockey League, 1973–1974), the Jacksonville Bullets (Sunshine Hockey League, 1992–1996), the Jacksonville Lizard Kings (East Coast Hockey League, 1995–2000), and the Jacksonville Barracudas (2002–2008). The Barracudas played in the World Hockey Association 2 and the Southern Professional Hockey League winning titles in both leagues. They initially played their home games in the city's arena, but lease increases forced them to find another venue; they went on a self-imposed suspension of operations in 2008 and did not return.

=== Lacrosse ===
The Jacksonville Bullies indoor lacrosse team were scheduled to play in the inaugural season of the North American Lacrosse League in 2012. After a dispute with the league, they played part of a season in the Professional Lacrosse League that year before canceling the rest of their games in October.

=== Soccer ===
The Jacksonville Tea Men played both standard and indoor soccer from 1980 – 1984. Their outdoor games were played at the Gator Bowl Stadium downtown. The team was moved from the Boston area, where they were known as the New England Tea Men, and initially played in the North American Soccer League. They later played in the United States Soccer League and the American Soccer League; they won the 1983 ASL Championship, but folded the following year.

The Jacksonville Cyclones played in the A-League from 1996 to 1999 and folded in 1999. The FC JAX Destroyers had men's and women's teams in the United Soccer Leagues from 2011 to 2012: a men's team in the USL Premier Development League and a women's team in the W-League. FC Jax Destroyers dissolved in 2012.

== See also ==
- Sports in Florida

== References and further reading ==
- James B. Cooks, Jacksonville: The Consolidation Story, from Civil Rights to the Jaguars, University Press of Florida, 2004.
- Buddy Martin, The Boys from Old Florida: Inside Gator Nation, Sports Publishing, 2006
- John Oehser, Jags to Riches: The Cinderella Season of the Jacksonville Jaguars, St. Martins Press, 1997.
- Daniel Schaefer, From scratch pads and dreams: A ten year history of the University of North Florida, University of North Florida, 1982.
