= Billy Bitter =

American lacrosse player

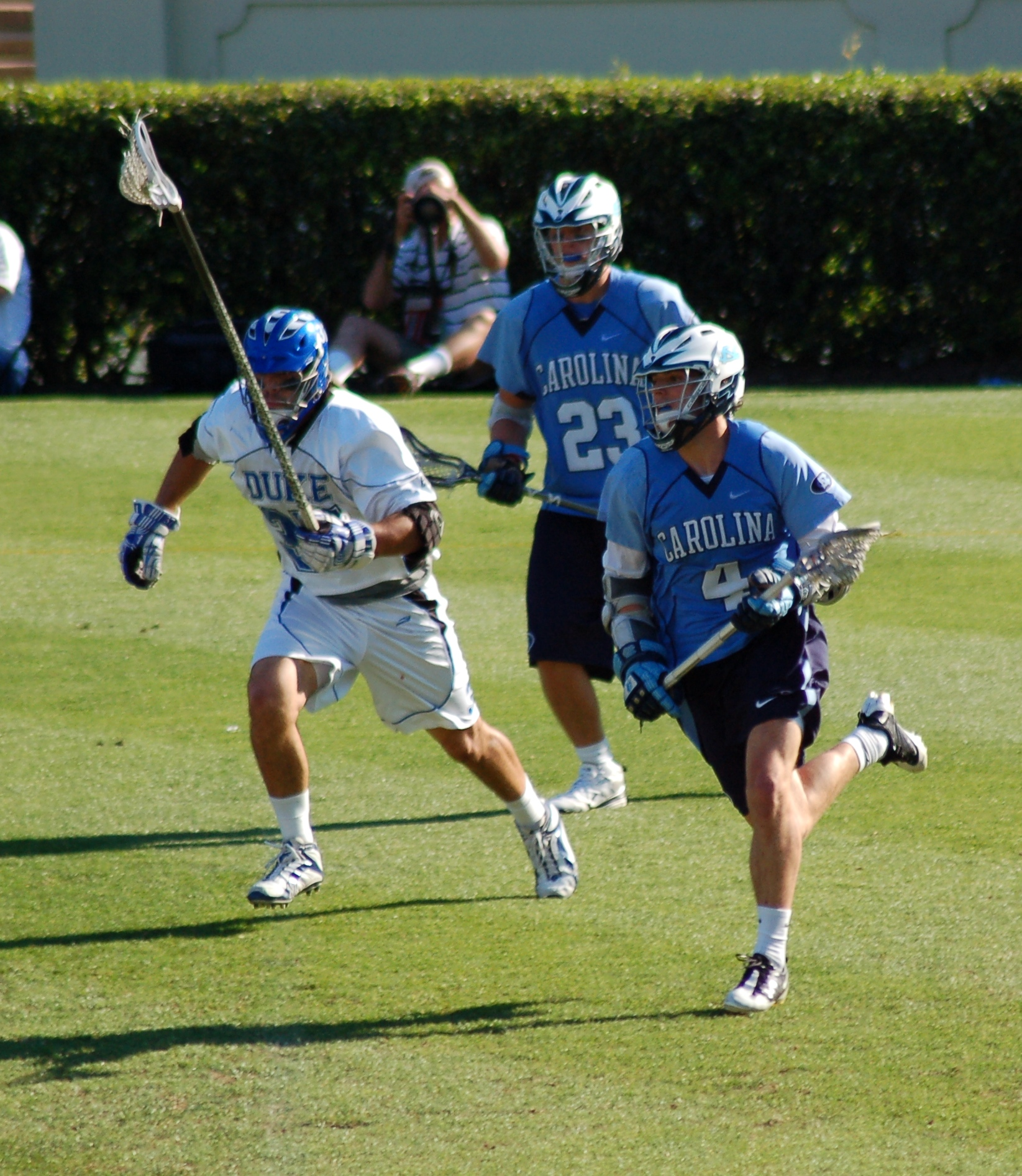
- Bitter advances the ball against Duke in 2008

Personal information
- Nationality: American
- Born: June 10, 1988 (age 38) Manhasset, New York
- Height: 6 ft 0 in (183 cm)
- Weight: 170 lb (77 kg; 12 st 2 lb)

Sport
- Position: Attack
- Shoots: Left
- NLL draft: 33rd overall, 2011; Buffalo Bandits
- MLL draft: 2011, 3rd Overall
- MLL team Former teams: Charlotte Hounds; Denver Outlaws
- NCAA team: University of North Carolina

William Benz Bitter (born June 10, 1988) is an American former professional lacrosse player for the Charlotte Hounds and Denver Outlaws of the outdoor Major League Lacrosse from 2011 to 2013. Bitter was also drafted by Buffalo Bandits of the indoor National Lacrosse League. Bitter played college lacrosse for the University of North Carolina.

== Personal ==
The son of Ward and Nancy Bitter, Bitter is one of 6 kids who all played lacrosse at the college level. His father, Ward Bitter II, is in the Boston College Hall of Fame for being an All-American lacrosse player at Boston College.

== Lacrosse career ==
Bitter accepted a scholarship to the University of North Carolina, where he was given the Jay Gallagher Award (given to the most valuable freshman on the North Carolina lacrosse team) his freshman year and named All-ACC 3 times. He was named 1st team All-American his sophomore and junior year and 2nd team All-American his senior year. His junior year, he was named Player of the Year in the Atlantic Coast Conference. Bitter was drafted by the Denver Outlaws 3rd overall in the 2011 MLL Collegiate Draft. He was traded to the Charlotte Hounds in a 2012 league expansion deal. In 2011, he was also selected in the 4th round of the National Lacrosse League draft by the Buffalo Bandits. Bitter was the 33rd pick overall. He was also taken in the 6th round of the North American Lacrosse League rookie entry draft with the last pick (Round 6, pick 30) by the Jacksonville Bullies. He chose to only play in the outdoor league of Major League Lacrosse. He signed an endorsement deal with Cascade Maverik Lacrosse in 2011.

== Statistics ==
=== University of North Carolina ===
Season	GP	G	A	Pts	PPG
2011	16	25	14	39	--
2010	15	22	22	44	--
2009	18	46	25	71	--
2008	14	6	15	21	--
Totals	63	99	76	175	--
