= Greg Bice =

American lacrosse player (born 1981)

Personal information
- Nickname: The Bicecreamman
- Nationality: American
- Born: April 15, 1981 (age 45) Bethesda, Maryland, U.S.
- Height: 6 ft 3 in (191 cm)
- Weight: 215 lb (98 kg; 15 st 5 lb)

Sport
- Position: Defense
- Shoots: Right
- MLL team Former teams: Ohio Machine; Rochester Rattlers; Chicago Machine; Los Angeles Riptide; Philadelphia Barrage
- NCAA team: Ohio State University
- Pro career: 2004–

Gregory Lawrence Bice (born April 15, 1981) is an American lacrosse player who wears number 44 for the Ohio Machine in Major League Lacrosse. He typically plays as a long pole defenseman, but can also be used as a midfielder (middy).

Bice attended Ohio State University and helped lead the men's lacrosse team to the NCAA finals twice, in 2003 and 2004. He also picked up numerous awards and honors along the way, including being named GWLL Conference Player of the Year in 2004.

He spent two years with Philadelphia and as soon as he was released, he was chosen first overall by the Los Angeles Riptide in the 2006 supplemental draft. Bice proved to be a valuable asset for the Riptide, earning a spot on the All-Star Team, being named NB Sportsman of the Year, and helping them to the MLL Finals in 2007, and to the Semi Final Round in 2008. Greg was picked up by the Chicago Machine after the LA Riptide were dissolved in 2009. In 2010 he was again selected as an MLL All-Star.

Greg Bice also owns and operates Resolute Lacrosse, LLC with teammate Anthony Kelly. Bice is a member of the advisory committee for the non-profit organization, Lacrosse the Nations. He recently received an MBA from the Max M. Fisher College of Business at the Ohio State University.

== Bio ==
=== Early years ===
Greg Bice was born at the National Naval Medical Center in Bethesda, Maryland, to Patti and William Bice. They moved to San Antonio, Texas, after he was born. Greg began playing lacrosse in the 8th grade. Bice continued playing lacrosse at Saint Mary's Hall through 1999, where he was an All-American. He also helped the lacrosse team to 2 of their 3 consecutive Texas High School Lacrosse League championships under Earl Bill and Pat Zoldi.

=== College career ===
Bice played college lacrosse at the Ohio State University, where he was a four-year starter after his freshman year. Bice was a 2-time All American, 3-time 1st team All Great Western Lacrosse League, and the 2004 Conference Player of the year. He also played in the North/South All-Star Game and served as team captain in 2004 when the Buckeyes played in the NCAA tournament for the second consecutive season.

=== Professional career ===
Greg started his career with Philadelphia from 2004 to 2005, but only played one game. The next year he was acquired First Round, First Draft Pick in the supplemental draft in 2006 by the Los Angeles Riptide. He was chosen above 223 others. He played 12 games in 2006 and scooped up 27 ground balls. In 2007 he had 3 points and 39 ground balls, was selected as an MLL All Star, and was chosen as the New Balance Sportsman of the Year. Greg continued his phenomenal play for LA in 2008 and served as captain while netting 3 pts and picking up 35 ground balls.

In 2007, Bice coached second year high school lacrosse team, the Middle Creek Mustangs to a Tri-8 Conference playoff appearance.

In 2009 the Los Angeles Riptide were dissolved and Greg was picked up by the Chicago Machine. He served as team captain, scored 2 pts and grabbed 33 ground balls. In the 2010 season, Bice stepped up his offense, scoring 7 points as of 15 July 2010. He was selected as a 2010 MLL All-Star.

Between MLL seasons, Greg played briefly in the North American Lacrosse League for the Kentucky Stickhorses. He played transition and the Stickhorses finished their first season 5-1 losing only their last game to the Boston Rockhoppers. The North American Lacrosse League was dissolved after the 2013 season.

He became a member of the Rochester Rattlers in 2011, when the Chicago Machine's roster was transferred. Bice had a very productive season in Rochester with 25 ground balls, a goal, and an assist in only 11 games. A year later, in 2012, with the resurrection of the Machine name in Columbus, Ohio, the Rattlers traded Bice and two other Ohio State alumni to the Ohio Machine for draft picks. Greg has played two seasons, as captain, with the Ohio Machine and plays an integral leadership role both on and off the field. Bice had a terrific 2012 season, grabbing 28 ground balls, netting 2 goals, and dishing out an assist. Unfortunately, his 2013 season was cut short due to an injury.

== Career statistics ==
=== Regular season ===
| YEAR | TEAM | GP | G | 2ptG | A | PTS | PIM | PPG | PPA | SHG | SHA | GWG | GB | S | SPCT | SOG | FO |
|---|---|---|---|---|---|---|---|---|---|---|---|---|---|---|---|---|---|
| 2013 | Ohio | 6 | 0 | 0 | 1 | 1 | 3 | 0 | 0 | 0 | 0 | 0 | 4 | 0 | .000 | 0 | 0-0 |
| 2012 | Ohio | 13 | 2 | 0 | 1 | 3 | 1 | 0 | 0 | 0 | 0 | 0 | 28 | 7 | .286 | 5 | 0-0 |
| 2011 | Rochester | 11 | 1 | 0 | 1 | 2 | 3.5 | 0 | 0 | 0 | 0 | 0 | 25 | 11 | .091 | 5 | 0-0 |
| 2010 | Chicago | 9 | 5 | 0 | 2 | 7 | 3.5 | 0 | 0 | 0 | 0 | 0 | 15 | 11 | .455 | 11 | 0-0 |
| 2009 | Chicago | 11 | 1 | 1 | 0 | 2 | 4.5 | 0 | 0 | 0 | 0 | 0 | 33 | 4 | .250 | 1 | 0-2 |
| 2008 | Los Angeles | 12 | 2 | 0 | 1 | 3 | 1 | 0 | 0 | 0 | 0 | 0 | 35 | 5 | .400 | 2 | 0-0 |
| 2007 | Los Angeles | 12 | 1 | 0 | 2 | 3 | 4 | 0 | 0 | 0 | 0 | 0 | 39 | 8 | .125 | 3 | 0-0 |
| 2006 | Los Angeles | 12 | 1 | 0 | 0 | 1 | 1 | 0 | 0 | 0 | 0 | 0 | 27 | 6 | .167 | 3 | 0-0 |
| 2005 | Philadelphia | 1 | 0 | 0 | 0 | 0 | 0 | 0 | 0 | 0 | 0 | 0 | 1 | 0 | .000 | 0 | 0-0 |
| 2004 | Philadelphia | 0 | 0 | 0 | 0 | 0 | 0 | 0 | 0 | 0 | 0 | 0 | 0 | 0 | .000 | 0 | 0-0 |
| TOTALS | | 57 | 10 | 1 | 5 | 16 | 14 | 0 | 0 | 0 | 0 | 0 | 150 | 34 | .000 | 20 | 0-2 |

=== Playoffs ===
| YEAR | TEAM | GP | G | 2ptG | A | PTS | PIM | PPG | PPA | SHG | SHA | GWG | GB | S | SPCT | SOG | FO |
|---|---|---|---|---|---|---|---|---|---|---|---|---|---|---|---|---|---|
| 2004 | Philadelphia | 0 | 0 | 0 | 0 | 0 | 0 | 0 | 0 | 0 | 0 | 0 | 0 | 0 | .000 | 0 | 0–0 |
| TOTALS | | 0 | 0 | 0 | 0 | 0 | 0 | 0 | 0 | 0 | 0 | 0 | 0 | 0 | .000 | 0 | 0–0 |

=== Tournament ===
| YEAR | TEAM | GP | G | 2ptG | A | PTS | PIM | PPG | PPA | SHG | SHA | GWG | GB | S | SPCT | SOG | FO |
|---|---|---|---|---|---|---|---|---|---|---|---|---|---|---|---|---|---|
| 2008 | Los Angeles | 1 | 0 | 0 | 0 | 0 | 0 | 0 | 0 | 0 | 0 | 0 | 2 | 0 | .000 | 0 | 0-0 |
| 2007 | Los Angeles | 2 | 0 | 0 | 0 | 0 | 1 | 0 | 0 | 0 | 0 | 0 | 8 | 1 | .000 | 1 | 0-0 |
| TOTALS | | 3 | 0 | 0 | 0 | 0 | 1 | 0 | 0 | 0 | 0 | 0 | 10 | 1 | .000 | 1 | |

== Awards and honors ==
- High School All American
- 2x College All American
- 3x 1st Team All GWLL
- 2003 OSU Team MVP
- 2004 OSU Team MVP
- 2004 OSU Defensive MVP
- 2004 GWLL Player of the Year
- 2007 MLL All-Star
- 2007 New Balance Sportsman of the Year
- 2007 Tri-Eight Coach of the Year
- 2008 LA Riptide Team Captain
- 2009 Chicago Machine Team Captain
- 2010 MLL All-Star
- 2011 New Balance Sportsman of the Year
- 2012 MLL All-Star
- 2012 Selected as member of Team USA for "Duel in Denver" exhibition
- 2012-13 Ohio Machine Team Captain

== Personal Info ==
Greg is married to Emily Bice. He graduated from Ohio State University with a degree in Welding Engineering. He has seven siblings, Billy, Tommy, Andrew, Zach, Jordan, Noah, and Courtney. He spent two years in Comayagua, Honduras, working as a missionary teacher. He is involved with the non-profit organization, Lacrosse the Nations, which is "an international humanitarian organization that utilizes sport and play to foster education and the development of critical life skills for children living in impoverished communities worldwide." He speaks Spanish and loves playing futbolito, a version of soccer played on a small walled court, popular in Latin America. His favorite food is sandwiches. Bice's game day routine includes a nap and prayer.
