= Sam Bradman =

American lacrosse player

Personal information
- Nationality: American
- Born: May 26, 1990 (age 36) Philadelphia, Pennsylvania, U.S.
- Height: 5 ft 11 in (180 cm)
- Weight: 175 lb (79 kg; 12 st 7 lb)

Sport
- Position: Midfielder
- Shoots: Right
- NCAA team: Salisbury University (2012)
- NLL draft: 24th overall, 2012; Minnesota Swarm
- NLL team Former teams: Georgia Swarm; Minnesota Swarm
- MLL team: Long Island Lizards (drafted 2012 3rd rnd, 18th overall)
- LXM Pro Tour team: Team STX

Sam Bradman (born May 26, 1990) is a retired professional lacrosse player from Canton, NY. He played at the midfield position in various professional leagues, most notably for Team STX of the LXM Pro Tour league.

He played college lacrosse at the Division III level for Salisbury University in Maryland, where he led his team to two consecutive NCAA Division III men's lacrosse championships and was named the 2012 National Division III Player of the Year.

He has been described as one of the most successful Division III college lacrosse players of his generation.

== College career ==
During high school, despite being recruited to play at the Division I level, Bradman opted to compete for the Seagulls of Division III powerhouse Salisbury University. He has stated that he made the choice so that he could follow in his father's footsteps as a physical educator.

=== Freshman year ===
During his freshman year, he scored 17 goals and 24 assists, and his team ended with a 16–4 record and NCAA Quarterfinal appearance.

=== Sophomore year ===
During his sophomore year, he recorded 58 goals and 28 assists for 86 points to lead the Seagulls in both points and goals. The team ended with a 21–2 record in the NCAA title game to Tufts, 9–6.

He was named was named the CAC Player of The Year, First Team All-American, and the USILA National Midfielder of The Year.

=== Junior year ===
During his junior year, Bradman led the Seagulls with 78 points from 55 goals and 23 assists. His team won the national championship that year, wherein Bradman scored 7 goals and 1 assist, and was named the Most Outstanding Player.

=== Senior year ===
Bradman's senior season was his best performance of his college career. He was named the National Division III Player of the Year, scoring 99 points off 71 goals and 28 assists. His team won a second consecutive national title ending with a perfect 23–0 record. Sam Bradman scored 6 goals and 1 assist in the championship game against Cortland State University. He was named the USILA Outstanding Player of the Year.

== Professional career ==
=== Field lacrosse ===
Bradman was drafted to play professional field lacrosse in both the Major League Lacrosse (MLL) and the LXM Pro Tour, and opted to play for the LXM Pro Tour. For decisions such as this, and his opting to play DIII college lacrosse over D1 college lacrosse, Bradman has been referred to as "The Most Interesting Man in Lacrosse."

He also briefly played for the MLL after its merge with the LXM Pro Tour.

=== Indoor lacrosse ===
On October 12, 2012, Bradman made his professional box lacrosse debut with the Charlotte Copperheads of the Professional Lacrosse League, scoring three goals against the Reading Rockets in the Copperheads' 18–10 win.

Sam made his unofficial National Lacrosse League debut for the Minnesota Swarm on December 8, 2012. In a preseason exhibition against the Rochester Knighthawks, he posted two goals in an 11–10 loss.

== U.S. men's national team ==
Bradman made his first official appearance with the U.S. Men's National Lacrosse Team during the Champions Challenge in Orlando, FL on January 26 and 27, 2013. After participating in a controlled scrimmage against Notre Dame on the 26th, Bradman led team USA to a 17–13 victory over NCAA defending National Champion Loyola on the 27th by scoring three goals and two assists (3–2–5), for which he was named MVP of the game. Team USA Head Coach Richie Meade was quoted as saying, "Sam had a chance to come out here and play, and he made the most of his opportunity. It's going to speak well for him moving forward," indicating Bradman would likely be back with the U.S. National Team in the future.

== Endorsements ==
Bradman signed an endorsement deal with leading lacrosse manufacturer STX upon the completion of his senior season.

== College statistics ==
Year	Team	GP-GS	Goals	Assists	Points	Shots	Shot %	GBs	Pen-Mins
2009	Salisbury Sea Gulls	20-0	17	24	41	67	.254	22	6–4.0
2010	Salisbury Sea Gulls	23-4	58	28	86	149	.389	43	9–8.0
2011	Salisbury Sea Gulls	19-11	55	23	78	137	.401	21	2–1.0
2012	Salisbury Sea Gulls	23-6	71	28	99	186	.382	40	11–10.0
College Totals		85-21	201	103	304	539	.373	126	28–23.0
