= Thomas Garvey =

Thomas or Tom Garvey may refer to:

== People ==
- Thomas Garvey, see Shakey the robot
- Sheriff Tom Garvey, see Jaybird–Woodpecker War
- Tom Garvey (lacrosse) in LXM Pro Tour

== Fictional characters ==
- Tommy Garvey, character in The Leftovers
- Tom Garvey, character in Frontier played by Stuart Randall (actor)
- Tom Garvey, character in The River (1984 film) played by Mel Gibson
