= Baltimore Bombers =

Baltimore Bombers may refer to:

- Baltimore Bombers (NALL), a former semi-professional indoor lacrosse team
- Baltimore Bombers (NFL), a proposed NFL expansion team
