= North American Lacrosse League =

Professional North American indoor lacrosse league from 2011–2013

- NALL logo
- Sport: Indoor lacrosse
- Founded: 2011
- First season: 2012
- Folded: 2013
- Country: United States
- Website: NorthAmericanLacrosseLeague.com

The North American Lacrosse League (NALL) was a professional indoor lacrosse league based in the United States. It was founded in 2011 as North America's fourth professional lacrosse league, after American Lacrosse League (field lacrosse, 1987) Major League Lacrosse (a field lacrosse league) and the National Lacrosse League (the established professional indoor lacrosse organization). However, a rift in the organization led to the departure of four of the five teams to form the Professional Lacrosse League. After playing only one "full" season that was plagued with canceled games, a franchise folding, and players not showing up for games, the leagues folded.

== History ==
The league was announced in May 2011. According to Sports Business Journal, the league once sought to become an official developmental league for the established National Lacrosse League, but the plan was rejected. Like the NLL but unlike other lacrosse leagues that play in the summer, the NALL originally intended to start play in January. The league announced it did not intend to compete with the NLL, but would serve alternate markets where the NLL had no presence. By December 2011 five franchises had been announced for the inaugural 2012 season: the Wilkes-Barre/Scranton Shamrocks, the Charlotte Copperheads, the Jacksonville Bullies, the Kentucky Stickhorses, and the Hershey Haymakers.

However, weeks before the season was to start a rift split the league over leadership and scheduling. One faction comprising four of the five announced teams – Wilkes-Barre/Scranton, Jacksonville, Charlotte, and Hershey – announced that the NALL had relieved acting Commissioner Anthony Caruso of duty and would be switching from a winter to a fall schedule. Caruso responded that his removal was not legitimate, asserting that the Hershey franchise had already been suspended for failure to secure a venue, and that Wilkes-Barre/Scranton owner Jim Jennings was no longer managing partner of that franchise. Caruso claimed that he represented the true NALL, which then consisted of the Kentucky Stickhorses, other members of the Wilkes-Barre/Scranton ownership group (eventually named the Lehigh Valley Flying Dutchmen), and a recently announced 2013 expansion franchise in Boston (which Caruso claimed would be ready to compete in 2012 and considered a voting member).

Both camps considered themselves the legitimate North American Lacrosse League. The fall group planned on starting play in September and claimed to have a television deal lined up. The winter group played an abbreviated schedule featuring matches against non-league teams beginning in January 2012. It controlled the NALL website and issued a restraining order against the other camp. The dispute was settled in litigation; as a result the winter faction retained the NALL name and branding, while the fall faction formed the Professional Lacrosse League, scheduled to begin play in September 2012.

On March 8, 2013, it was officially reported the Baltimore Bombers had folded. General manager and head coach, Hunter Francis noted that "...the economics didn't work." This news initially broke on Laxdirt.com and later on their Facebook page. Just two days before, the Bombers posted about giveaway at the game scheduled for March 10.

The 2013 league championship was viewable via internet pay-per-view for the cost of $2.95 at northamericanlacrosseleague.com/live

One June 18, 2013 the Kentucky Stickhorses posted on their Facebook a message from their owner, Anthony Chase, stating the NALL had suspended operations due to the Baltimore, Boston, and Rhode Island franchises not being able to continue operations due to "financial constraints." The messaged also stated that the Stickhorses had two options: "Join another 'startup' league or suspend operations as well. It is with deep regret, that I have to choose the latter."

== Teams ==
Team	City/Area	Arena (Capacity)	Founded	Joined	Folded
Baltimore Bombers	Baltimore, Maryland	Clarence H. "Du" Burns Arena (650)	2012	2013	2013
Boston Rockhoppers	Marlborough, Massachusetts	New England Sports Center (2,000)	2012	2013	2013
Charlotte Copperheads	Charlotte, North Carolina	Bojangles' Coliseum (9,605)	2011	N/A	2012
Hershey Haymakers	Hershey, Pennsylvania	Giant Center (10,500)	2011	N/A	2012
Jacksonville Bullies	Jacksonville, Florida	Jacksonville Veterans Memorial Arena (13,141)	2011	N/A	2012
Kentucky Stickhorses	Louisville, Kentucky	Freedom Hall (17,062)	2011	2012	2013
Lehigh Valley Flying Dutchmen	Bethlehem, Pennsylvania	Stabler Arena (6,000)	2012	2012	2012
Rhode Island Kingfish	Kingston, Rhode Island	Travel team only	2012	2013	2013
Wilkes-Barre/Scranton Shamrocks	Wilkes Barre, Pennsylvania	Mohegan Sun Arena at Casey Plaza (8,300)	2011	N/A	2012

== Championship ==
Season	Date	Champion	Score	Runner-up	MVP	Host
2013	3/16/13	Boston Rockhoppers	25-13	Kentucky Stickhorses	Mike Stone	Kentucky

== See also ==
- Canadian Lacrosse League (2012–2016)
- Major Series Lacrosse
- Major League Lacrosse
- Western Lacrosse Association
- List of professional sports teams in the United States and Canada
