= List of events at Freedom Hall =

Freedom Hall is an indoor arena in Louisville, Kentucky that hosts a variety of events.

== NCAA Division I Men's Tournament ==
=== 1958–1963 ===
1958 Final Four

- Kentucky 61, Temple 60 (national semifinal)
- Seattle 73, Kansas State 51 (national semifinal)
- Temple 67, Kansas State 57 (national third place)
- Kentucky 84, Seattle 72 (national championship)

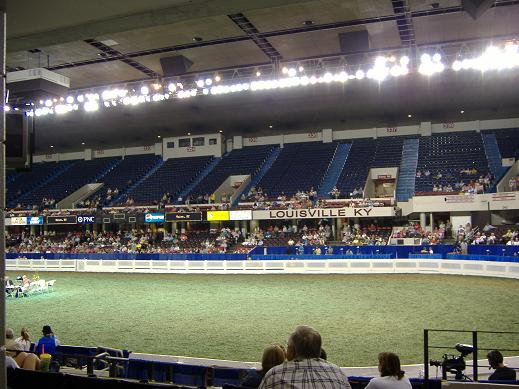
Inside Freedom Hall

1959 Final Four

- West Virginia 94, Louisville 79 (national semifinal)
- California 64, Cincinnati 58 (national semifinal)
- Cincinnati 98, Louisville 85 (national third place)
- California 71, West Virginia 70 (national championship)

1962 Final Four

- Ohio State 84, Wake Forest 68 (national semifinal)
- Cincinnati 72, UCLA 70 (national semifinal)
- Wake Forest 82, UCLA 80 (national third place)
- Cincinnati 71, Ohio State 59 (national championship)

1963 Final Four

- Loyola 94, Duke 75 (national semifinal)
- Cincinnati 80, Oregon State 46 (national semifinal)
- Duke 85, Oregon State 63 (national third place)
- Loyola 60, Cincinnati 58 (national championship, overtime)

=== 1967–1976 ===
1967 Final Four

- Dayton 76, North Carolina 62 (national semifinal)
- UCLA 73, Houston 58 (national semifinal)
- Houston 84, North Carolina 62 (national third place)
- UCLA 79, Dayton 64 (national championship)

1969 Final Four

- Purdue 92, North Carolina 65 (national semifinal)
- UCLA 85, Drake 82 (national semifinal)
- Drake 104, North Carolina 84 (national third place)
- UCLA 92, Purdue 72 (national championship)

1976 Midwest Regional

- Michigan 80, Notre Dame 76 (regional semifinal)
- Missouri 86, Texas Tech 75 (regional semifinal)
- Michigan 95, Missouri 88 (regional final)

1983 Midwest Regional First and Second Rounds

- Georgetown 68, Alcorn State 63 (first round, 5 seed vs. 12 seed)
- Iowa 64, Utah State 59 (first round, 7 seed vs. 10 seed)
- Memphis 66, Georgetown 57 (second round, 4 seed vs. 5 seed)
- Iowa 77, Missouri 63 (second round, 7 seed vs. 2 seed)

1987 Southeast Regional

- Georgetown 70, Kansas 57 (regional semifinal, 1 seed vs. 5 seed)
- Providence 103, Alabama 82 (regional semifinal, 6 seed vs. 2 seed)
- Providence 88, Georgetown 73 (regional final, 6 seed vs. 1 seed)

1991 Southeast Regional First and Second Rounds

- Pittsburgh 76, Georgia 68 (first round, 6 seed vs. 11 seed, overtime)
- Kansas 55, New Orleans 49 (first round, 3 seed vs. 14 seed)
- Florida State 75, Southern California 72 (first round, 7 seed vs. 10 seed)
- Indiana 79, Coastal Carolina 69 (first round, 2 seed vs. 15 seed)
- Kansas 77, Pittsburgh 66 (second round, 3 seed vs. 6 seed)
- Indiana 82, Florida State 60 (second round, 2 seed vs. 7 seed)

== NCAA Division I Women's Tournament ==
2010 Kansas City Regional First and Second Rounds

- First round (in order of play):
  - (5) Michigan State 72, (12) Bowling Green 62
  - (4) Kentucky 83, (13) Liberty 77
- Second round:
  - (4) Kentucky 70, (5) Michigan State 52

== NCAA Division II Men's Tournament ==
2013 Elite Eight

- Quarterfinals (in order of play): Four games (teams TBD)
- Semifinals (in order of play): Two games (teams TBD)
- The 2013 final will be held at Philips Arena in Atlanta as part of the celebrations of the 75th NCAA Division I men's tournament.

== NCAA Conference Tournaments ==
- Metro Conference—1980, 1981, 1985, 1986, 1987, 1992, 1993, 1995
- Conference USA—2001, 2003
- NIT first and second rounds – 2002, 2006

== Professional basketball ==
The Kentucky Colonels of the American Basketball Association played their home games in Freedom Hall for six seasons, from the fall of 1970 until the ABA–NBA merger in June 1976. The Colonels moved to Freedom Hall after playing their first three seasons at the Convention Center (1967–68 through 1969–70).

The first female to play in a professional basketball game did so on the floor of Freedom Hall during a Kentucky Colonels game. Penny Ann Early, an aspiring jockey, briefly entered the game for the Kentucky Colonels against the Los Angeles Stars on November 28, 1968.

The 1972 ABA All-Star Game was played at Freedom Hall on January 29, 1972. 15,738 fans attended; the East, coached by Kentucky Colonels coach Joe Mullaney, defeated the West 142–115. The game's Most Valuable Player was the Kentucky Colonels' Dan Issel.

Many ABA playoff games were held at Freedom Hall including the Kentucky Colonels winning the 1975 American Basketball Association Championship at Freedom Hall. The following ABA playoff games were played at Freedom Hall:

- 1971: Games 1, 2 and 5 of the 1971 Eastern Division Semifinals (Kentucky Colonels over The Floridians 4 games to 2); Games 1, 3 4 and 6 of the 1971 Eastern Division Finals (Kentucky Colonels over the Virginia Squires, 4 games to 2); and Games 3, 4 and 6 of the 1971 American Basketball Association Championship (Utah Stars over the Kentucky Colonels 4 games to 3).
- 1972: Games 1, 2 and 5 of the 1972 Eastern Division Semifinals (New York Nets over the Kentucky Colonels, 4 games to 2).
- 1973: Games 1, 2 and 5 of the 1973 Eastern Division Semifinals (Kentucky Colonels over the Virginia Squires 4 games to 1); Games 3, 4 and 6 of the 1973 Eastern Division Finals (Kentucky Colonels over the Carolina Cougars 4 games to 3); and Games 1, 2, 5 and 7 of the 1973 American Basketball Association Championship (Indiana Pacers over the Kentucky Colonels, 4 games to 3).
- 1974: Games 1 and 2 of the 1974 Eastern Division Semifinals (Kentucky Colonels over the Carolina Cougars, 4 games to 0); Games 3 and 4 of the 1974 Eastern Division Finals (New York Nets over the Kentucky Colonels 4 games to 0).
- 1975: 1975 one-game playoff for 1975 First Place in the Eastern Division (Kentucky Colonels 108, New York Nets 99); Games 1, 2 and 5 of the 1975 Eastern Division Semifinals (Kentucky Colonels over the Memphis Sounds, 4 games to 1); Games 1, 2 and 5 of the 1975 Eastern Division Finals (Kentucky Colonels over the Spirits of St. Louis, 4 games to 1); and Games 1, 2 and 5 of the 1975 American Basketball Association Championship (Kentucky Colonels over the Indiana Pacers, 4 games to 1).
- 1976: Games 1 and 3 of the 1976 First Round Miniseries (Kentucky Colonels over the Indiana Pacers, 2 games to 1); Games 3, 4 and 6 of the 1976 Semifinals (Denver Nuggets over the Kentucky Colonels, 4 games to 3). The Colonels' final game was played in this series, a 133–110 loss at Denver on April 28, 1976.

=== Games and scores ===
In addition, the Kentucky Colonels played several exhibition games against teams from the National Basketball Association in Freedom Hall, winning nine and losing five, including:

- September 22, 1971: Kentucky Colonels 111, Baltimore Bullets 85 (attendance, 13,821)
- October 8, 1971: Milwaukee Bucks 99, Kentucky Colonels 93 (attendance over 18,000)
- October 9, 1971: New York Knicks 112, Kentucky Colonels 100 (attendance, 12,238)
- October 1, 1972: Milwaukee Bucks 131, Kentucky Colonels 100
- October 6, 1972: Phoenix Suns 103, Kentucky Colonels 91
- October 7, 1972: Baltimore Bullets 95, Kentucky Colonels 93
- September 21, 1973 Kentucky Colonels 110, Houston Rockets 102
- September 22, 1973 Kentucky Colonels 110, Kansas City–Omaha Kings 99
- October 1, 1974 Kentucky Colonels 118, Washington Bullets 95
- October 8, 1974 Kentucky Colonels 109, Detroit Pistons 100
- October 12, 1974 Kentucky Colonels 93, Chicago Bulls 75
- October 8, 1975 Kentucky Colonels 93, Golden State Warriors 90 (the Colonels and Warriors were the defending ABA and NBA Champions, respectively)
- October 10, 1975 Kentucky Colonels 96, Milwaukee Bucks 91
- October 14, 1975 Kentucky Colonels 120, Buffalo Braves 116

== VEX Robotics World Championships ==
- 2015 VEX Robotics World Championship – April 15, 2015 – April 18, 2015
- 2016 VEX Robotics World Championship – April 20, 2016 – April 23, 2016
- 2017 VEX Robotics World Championship – April 19, 2017 – April 25, 2017
- 2018 VEX Robotics World Championship – April 25, 2018 – May 1, 2018
- 2019 VEX Robotics World Championship – April 24, 2019 – April 30, 2019

== Non-sports events ==
=== Concerts ===
List of Concerts
- Bo Diddley – September 24, 1960
- The Beach Boys – July 16, 1964, with The Kingsmen, October 6, 1967, with The Box Tops, Soul Inc and The Alphabetical Order, October 22, 1968, with The Pickle Brothers, 1910 Fruitgum Company and Tom Dooley & The Lovelights and April 1, 1975, with Billy Joel
- The Monkees – December 28, 1966
- The Doors – October 31, 1968
- Jerry Lee Lewis – September 3, 1969
- The Byrds – April 20, 1970
- Janis Joplin & The Full Tilt Boogie Band – June 12, 1970
- The Grand Funk Railroad – March 27, 1971, with Bloodrock
- Santana – June 10, 1971, with The Tower of Power
- Three Dog Night – March 24, 1972
- Chicago – June 12, 1974, November 3, 1977, and May 23, 1992, with The Moody Blues
- The Grateful Dead – June 18, 1974 (recorded and released as Road Trips Volume 2 Number 3), April 9, 1989, and June 15–16, 1993
- Frank Zappa & The Mothers of Invention – November 25, 1974
- Barry Manilow – May 1, 1975, and October 15, 1981
- The Electric Light Orchestra – July 15, 1975, with Slade and Pavlov's Dog
- The Rolling Stones – August 4, 1975, with The Outlaws and November 3, 1981, with George Thorogood & The Destroyers and The J. Geils Band
- The Faces – September 30, 1975
- Aerosmith – October 13, 1975, with Ted Nugent and Rush, December 7, 1976, July 3, 1977, October 21, 1978, with Golden Earring, April 30, 1988, with White Lion, January 27, with Skid Row and May 2, 1990, December 3, 1994, with Jackyl, December 9, 1998, and December 8, 2003, with KISS
- Black Sabbath – December 6, 1975, with Manfred Mann's Earth Band, Ruby Starr and Grey Ghost and October 10, 1980, with Blue Öyster Cult
- KISS – December 27, 1975, September 8, 1976, December 12, 1977, with AC/DC, September 16, 1979, with Judas Priest, December 15, 1984, with Krokus, December 12, 1985, with Queensrÿche, December 29, 1987, with Ted Nugent, June 30, 1996, with Alice in Chains and April 29, 2000, with Ted Nugent and Skid Row
- Styx – January 10, 1976, with REO Speedwagon and Bob Seger & The Silver Bullet Band, May 19, with Foghat and Head East and December 10, with April Wine, 1977, September 23 and November 23, 1979, March 27, 1981, and February 26, 2010, with REO Speedwagon and .38 Special
- Deep Purple – January 31, 1976
- ZZ Top – June 7, 1976, December 14, 1979, April 9, 1980, June 12, 1981, with Loverboy, June 5, 1983, with Quiet Riot and Sammy Hagar, May 3, 1986, January 9, 1991, with The Black Crowes, February 8, 2000, with Lynyrd Skynyrd and August 20, 2004
- Elton John – July 20, 1976, October 18, 1997, and December 5, 2000
- Elvis Presley & The TCB Band – July 23, 1976, and May 21, 1977
- Emerson, Lake & Palmer – March 24–25, 1977
- Boston – March 28, 1977, and January 27 and March 21, 1979
- Led Zeppelin – April 25, 1977, with Rick Derringer
- Neil Diamond – April 26, 1977, December 19, 1984, May 31, 1993, and September 23, 1996
- Bob Seger & The Silver Bullet Band – May 6 and December 26, 1977, January 3, with The Winters Brothers Band and December 26 and 28, with Molly Hatchet, 1978, July 13, 1980, with REO Speedwagon, Point Blank and The Rockets and December 12, 2006, with Eric Church
- Pink Floyd – June 17, 1977
- Yes – August 28, 1977, April 13, 1979, with Donovan and The Dukes, October 13, 1980, August 15, 1984, and November 22, 1987
- Fleetwood Mac – September 21, 1977, with Stephen Bishop and October 6, 1987, with The Cruzados
- Jimmy Buffett & The Coral Reefer Band – October 7, 1977, with Jesse Winchester
- Ted Nugent – October 15, 1977, with Nazareth and T. Rex, May 25, 1979, with Roadmaster and June 26, 1981, with Krokus and Blackfoot
- Rod Stewart – October 29, 1977, April 27, 1979, January 11, 1992, and March 17, 1999
- Kansas – December 4, 1977, with Pablo Cruise, July 4, 1979, and February 8, 2003, with Styx and John Waite
- John Denver – April 10, 1978, and April 27 and May 1, 1980
- REO Speedwagon – June 23, 1978, with Rainbow and Nantucket, February 17, 1981, with .38 Special, December 28, 1984, with Survivor and November 18, 2000, with Styx and Survivor
- Crosby, Stills & Nash – July 8, 1978, and October 28, 1984, with Paul Butterfield
- The Commodores – July 14, 1978, with Con Funk Shun and A Taste of Honey
- Bob Dylan – October 24, 1978, August 18, 1989, with Steve Earle and October 17, 2007, with Elvis Costello and Amos Lee
- Billy Joel – December 8, 1978, February 6, 1987, March 29, 1994, and April 26, 2001, with Elton John
- Heart – February 19, 1979, with Exile and September 28, 1982, with John Mellencamp
- Alice Cooper – March 3, 1979, with The Babys
- The Statler Brothers – March 17, 1979, with Barbara Mandrell
- Barry White & The Love Unlimited Orchestra – March 25, 1979, with Instant Funk
- Eric Clapton – April 17, 1979
- Bad Company – May 18, 1979, with Carillo
- Kenny Rogers – October 17, 1979, with Dottie West and The Oak Ridge Boys, October 2, 1982, with Larry Gatlin & The Gatlin Brothers Band and March 1, 1985, with Dolly Parton and Sawyer Brown
- Rick James – March 22, 1980, with Prince and Twennynine
- Journey – May 2, 1980, May 18, 1982, with The Babys, October 1, 1986, with Glass Tiger, August 21, 2008, with Cheap Trick and Heart and August 17, 2012, with Pat Benatar and Loverboy
- Triumph – May 18, 1980, with Shooting Star and October 2, 1981, with Point Blank
- Van Halen – July 28, 1980, May 22, 1981, July 30, 1982, with After the Fire, February 9, 1984, with Autograph, April 18, 1986, February 8, 1992, with The Baby Animals and July 6, 2004, with Silvertide
- Foghat – October 5, 1980, with The Outlaws
- Judas Priest – July 10, 1981, with Iron Maiden and April 14, 1984
- Foreigner – December 11, 1981, with The Michael Stanley Band
- Ozzy Osbourne – April 17, 1982, with Magnum, May 2, 1986, with Metallica, October 27, 1992, with Alice in Chains and December 10, 2001, with Rob Zombie, Mudvayne and SOiL
- The Who – October 7, 1982, with T-Bone Burnett
- Hall & Oates – July 3, 1983
- Loverboy – September 16, 1983, with Zebra
- Iron Maiden – October 18, 1983, and February 1, 1985
- Ratt – September 30, 1984, with Blackfoot, December 9, 1986, with Cheap Trick and December 4, 1990, with Vixen
- Bruce Springsteen & The E Street Band – January 10, 1985, and April 15, 2000
- Bryan Adams – June 8, 1985, and July 14, 1987
- Mötley Crüe – September 25, 1985, with Y&T, September 21, 1987, July 17, 1990, and September 20, 2005
- Dio – October 9, 1985, with Rough Cutt
- Luciano Pavarotti – January 30, 1986
- Run-DMC – July 31, 1987 with Beastie Boys
- Prince & The Revolution – June 10, 1986
- Whitney Houston – August 15, 1986
- Rush – March 17, 1987, with The Babys and The Pat Travers Band
- Bon Jovi – March 20, 1987, with Cinderella
- Huey Lewis and the News – April 9, 1987, with The Robert Cray Band
- The Beastie Boys – July 31, 1987, with Run–D.M.C.
- Stevie Ray Vaughan & Double Trouble – August 21, 1987
- Tina Turner – October 24, 1987, and March 31, 2000, with Lionel Richie and Janice Robinson
- John Mellencamp – December 5, 1987, October 1, 1999, April 18, 2005, with Donovan and October 28, 2007, with Los Lobos
- Kiss – December 29, 1987, with Ted Nugent https://hunter.goatley.com/concerts/1987-12-29-kiss.html
- Def Leppard – January 29, 1988, with Tesla, November 21, 1992, August 26, 2007, with Styx and Foreigner and August 19, 2011, with Heart
- Michael Jackson – March 20, 1988
- AC/DC – May 24, 1988, May 29, 1991, with L.A. Guns, March 11, 1996, with The Poor and April 13, 2010, with Broken Spurs
- Journey – September 30, 1988
- Eddie Money – May 4, 1989
- Tesla – May 5, 1989
- Metallica – August 11, 1989, with The Cult, March 19, 1992, with Metal Church, February 4, 1993, February 2, 1997, with Corrosion of Conformity and April 28, 2004
- Janet Jackson – March 9, 1990, with Chuckii Booker and January 25, 2002
- Little Feat – August 16, 1991
- MC Hammer – May 1, 1992
- Ringo Starr & His All-Starr Band – August 21, 1992
- Joe Walsh – May 29, 1993, with Glenn Frey
- Nirvana – October 25, 1993
- Mary Chapin Carpenter – April 2, 1995, with The Mavericks
- Hootie & the Blowfish – October 22, 1995
- The Smashing Pumpkins – October 29, 1996, with Garbage
- The Stone Temple Pilots – May 1, 1997, with Cheap Trick
- Bush – May 2, 1997, with Veruca Salt
- Garth Brooks – May 20–23, 1998, with Trisha Yearwood
- Shania Twain – July 8, 1998, with Leahy and May 19, 2004, with Emerson Drive
- The Backstreet Boys – July 25, 1998, with Aaron Carter
- NSYNC – May 9, 1999
- Tom Petty and the Heartbreakers – July 21, 1999, and May 12, 2010, with Joe Cocker
- Cher – February 9, 2000 and September 5, 2002, with Cyndi Lauper
- Britney Spears – March 13, 2000, with LFO
- The Red Hot Chili Peppers – July 4, 2000, with The Foo Fighters and Blonde Redhead
- The Dixie Chicks – August 17, 2000 and May 18, 2003, with Joan Osborne
- Tim McGraw – October 18, 2000, with Faith Hill, March 26, 2003, with The Dancehall Doctors and August 21, 2010, with Montgomery Gentry
- Kenny Chesney – November 25, 2000, August 19, 2004, with The Rascal Flatts and Keith Urban, August 28, 2005, with Gretchen Wilson and Pat Green, July 6, 2006, with Dierks Bentley and May 22, 2009, with Sugarland and Billy Currington
- Creed – December 12, 2000, with Finger Eleven and Sevendust and July 22, 2002
- Hank Williams, Jr. – August 16, 2001, with Toby Keith and Montgomery Gentry, August 16, 2003, with Montgomery Gentry and April 3, 2010, with The Grascals, Jamey Johnson and Eric Church and August 16, 2012, with George Thorogood & The Destroyers
- The Guess Who – September 21, 2001, with Joe Cocker
- Tool – October 18, 2001, with Tricky
- Kid Rock & Twisted Brown Trucker – March 23, 2002, with Tenacious D, February 27, 2004, with Puddle of Mudd, March 3, 2006, with Ty Stone and March 15, 2008, with Rev. Run and Dickey Betts & Great Southern
- Emmylou Harris – June 25, 2002, with Union Station and Patty Loveless
- The Eagles – July 5, 2002
- The Rascal Flatts – August 15, 2002, with Chris Cagle, November 14, 2003, with Chris Cagle and Brian McComas, September 18, 2008, with Kellie Pickler and Taylor Swift, August 29, 2010, with Kellie Pickler and Chris Young and August 18, 2012, with Little Big Town, Edens Edge and The Eli Young Band
- Brooks & Dunn – August 17, 2002, with Dwight Yoakam, August 21, 2004, with Gary Allan and Josh Turner and August 14, 2008, with ZZ Top and Rodney Atkins
- George Strait & The Ace in the Hole Band – February 28, 2003, with Tammy Cochran and March 4, 2006, with Tracy Lawrence and Miranda Lambert
- Staind – June 6, 2003, with Hoobastank, Cold and Smile Empty Soul
- The SCREAM Tour – July 13, 2003
- Alan Jackson & The Strayhorns – August 14, 2003, with Joe Nichols
- Toby Keith – February 5, 2004, with Blake Shelton and Scotty Emerick, March 11, 2005, with Ted Nugent and February 6, 2009, with Jack Ingram
- Alabama – March 6 and June 17, 2004
- John Mayer – March 12, 2004, with Guster and March 13, 2010, with Michael Franti & Spearhead
- Yanni – March 19, 2004
- The Gaither Homecoming – March 27, 2004 and December 11, 2010
- The New Classic Rock All–Stars – August 6, 2004
- Chris Cagle – August 29, 2004
- The Trans-Siberian Orchestra – November 19, 2004 and November 12, 2005
- Josh Groban – March 6, 2005
- Crossfade – June 10, 2005, with The Exies
- Ronnie Milsap – August 6, 2005
- Coldplay – February 23, 2006, with Fiona Apple
- Nickelback – March 25, 2006, with Chevelle and Trapt
- American Idol Live! – August 18, 2006
- Delirium – October 27–29, 2006
- Ludacris – January 12, 2007
- The Wiggles – February 28, 2007 (2 shows)
- The Blue Man Group – March 17, 2007, with Mike Relm and April 25, 2008, with Mike Relm
- Big & Rich – March 23, 2007, with Cowboy Troy
- The Charlie Daniels Band – April 13, 2007
- Martina McBride – April 15, with Rodney Atkins and Little Big Town and July 19, with Little Big Town, 2007
- Lynyrd Skynyrd – June 15, 2007 (recorded and released as Live from Freedom Hall)
- Trace Adkins – August 18, 2007, with Dierks Bentley and August 24, 2008, with Miranda Lambert and Keith Anderson
- The Doodlebops – November 9, 2007
- Reba McEntire – January 18, 2008, with Kelly Clarkson and Melissa Peterman
- The Casting Crowns – March 8 and May 4, 2008, with Leeland, April 4, 2009 and March 26, 2011
- Michael Bublé – March 14, 2008
- Jay and the Americans – August 1, 2008
- Brad Paisley & The Drama Kings – August 16, 2008, with Jewel, Chuck Wicks and Julianne Hough
- Jason Mraz – November 3, 2008
- Keith Urban – August 22, 2009, with Pat Green
- Taylor Swift – August 30, 2009, with Kellie Pickler and Gloriana
- Third Day – October 17, 2009
- Miley Cyrus – October 31, 2009, with Metro Station
- The Radio City Christmas Spectacular – December 8, 2009
- Lee Greenwood – February 10, 2010
- John Anderson – March 26, 2010
- The Winter Jam Tour Spectacular – March 28, 2010, February 3, 2011, February 3, 2012, February 2, 2013, January 24, 2014 and January 3, 2015
- Steven Curtis Chapman – April 17, 2010, with Michael W. Smith
- Lady Antebellum – April 26, 2010 and August 18, 2011
- Sugarland – August 19, 2010, with Little Big Town
- Slayer – October 12, 2010, with Megadeth and Anthrax
- Keith Anderson – April 1, 2011, with Halfway to Hazard
- Jason Aldean – August 20, 2011, with Thompson Square and Chris Young
- Maroon 5 – August 28, 2011, with Train and Matt Nathanson
- Jeremy Camp – April 6, 2013
- Justin Moore – October 4, 2014, with Thomas Rhett and Parmalee
- The Rock & Worship Roadshow – March 7, 2015

=== Other events ===
- National Quartet Convention – annually in September
- WCW Uncensored (1999)
- WWF Judgment Day 2000
- Promise Keepers 2006
- National FFA Convention 1999–2005
- Professional Bull Riders Bud Light Cup 2002
- Monster Jam
