= Rhode Island Kingfish =

American Indoor Lacrosse team in Kingston, Rhode Island

- Founded: 2012
- Based in: Kingston, Rhode Island
- Colors: Red, Blue, White, Yellow
- Head coach: Charlie Blanchard
- General manager: Michael Lydon
- Website: rhodeislandkingfish.com

The Rhode Island Kingfish was an American indoor lacrosse team based in Kingston, Rhode Island. They were a member of the North American Lacrosse League. During 2013 season the Kingfish were scheduled for a limited 6 game road schedule. Due to the Baltimore Bombers folding mid-season the Kingfish only played 4 games, and posted zero wins on the season.

== History ==
The franchise was announced as an expansion member of the North American Lacrosse League on July 26, 2012. The Kingfish would be one of two expansion teams for the 2013 season, the other was the Baltimore Bombers

The Kingfish originally announced they would play their 2013 home schedule at the Bradford R. Boss Arena, but on January 4, 2013 the Kingfish released a statement saying, in part, "Due to an unforeseen logistical situation, the Rhode Island Kingfish will be opening the 2013 season on the road." The rest of the NALL team also updated their schedules, with none of the teams schedules having an away game in Rhode Island.

== Roster ==
2013 Rhode Island Kingfish
Number	Player's Name	Position	College	Height	Weight
	Steven Boyle		Johns Hopkins
	Parker Brown		Brown
	Gary Crowley		Bryant
	Joe Evans		Salisbury University
	Gareth Fabian		Cazenovia
	JJ Gilbane		Cornell
	Tim Harder		Syracuse
	Dan Hettler		Fairfield
	Daniel Kelly		Salem State
	David Kemp		Herkimer CC
	Brian Krol		Cortland
	AJ Laffin		St Johns-Fisher
	Ryan Licht		Fairleigh Dickinson University
	Jameson Love		Bryant
	Dan Maclssac		AIC
	Michael Maggio		Lasell
	Mike Nadler		Bates
	Brandon Noble		Georgian
	Kyle Norchi		Plattsburgh
	James Schutt		Monroe CC
	Matt Smalley		Hobart
	Kyle Sminkey		Vermont
	Zach Smith		Sacred Heart
	Rich Szymanski		St. Lawrence
	Zach Taylor		New Hampshire
	Matt Vozzolo		New England
	David Wood		St Johns-Fisher

== Current Season ==
2013 Rhode Island Kingfish Season
Date & Time	Away team	Score	Home team	Score	Game Notes
January 12 @ 7:00 PM	Rhode Island	14	Kentucky Stickhorses	17
January 20 @ 3:00 PM	Rhode Island	8	Baltimore Bombers	12
February 2 @ 7:00 PM	Rhode Island	7	Boston Rockhoppers	20
February 9 @ 8:00 PM✝	Rhode Island	N/A	Baltimore Bombers	N/A	CANCELED
February 23 @ 7:00 PM	Rhode Island Kingfish	14	Boston Rockhoppers	15	Postponed until March 9
March 16 @ 7:00 PM✝	Rhode Island	N/A	Kentucky Stickhorses	N/A	CANCELED

✝ Games canceled due to Baltimore Bombers mid-season fold.

== Season-by-Season ==
Year	Reg. season	Playoffs	Attendance average
2013	In Progress	TBD	TBD
