= Mike Stone (lacrosse) =

Personal information
- Nationality: American
- Born: June 28, 1986 (age 40) Wellesley, Massachusetts
- Height: 5 ft 11 in (180 cm)
- Weight: 175 lb (79 kg; 12 st 7 lb)

Sport
- Position: Midfielder
- NLL draft: 59th overall, 2009; Boston Blazers
- MLL team: Boston Cannons
- team: Middlebury College

Career highlights
- MLL champion (2011); MLL All Star (2012, 2013)

Mike Stone (born June 28, 1986) is a professional lacrosse player for the Boston Cannons of the MLL. He was a star midfielder at Middlebury College and was selected in the 9th round of the 2010 MLL Supplemental Draft by the Cannons. He is a two-time MLL All-Star (2012, 2013) and a one-time MLL Champion (2011).
