= New England Sports Center =

Ice-skating facility in Marlborough, Massachusetts

Coordinates: 42.363443°N 71.596548°W

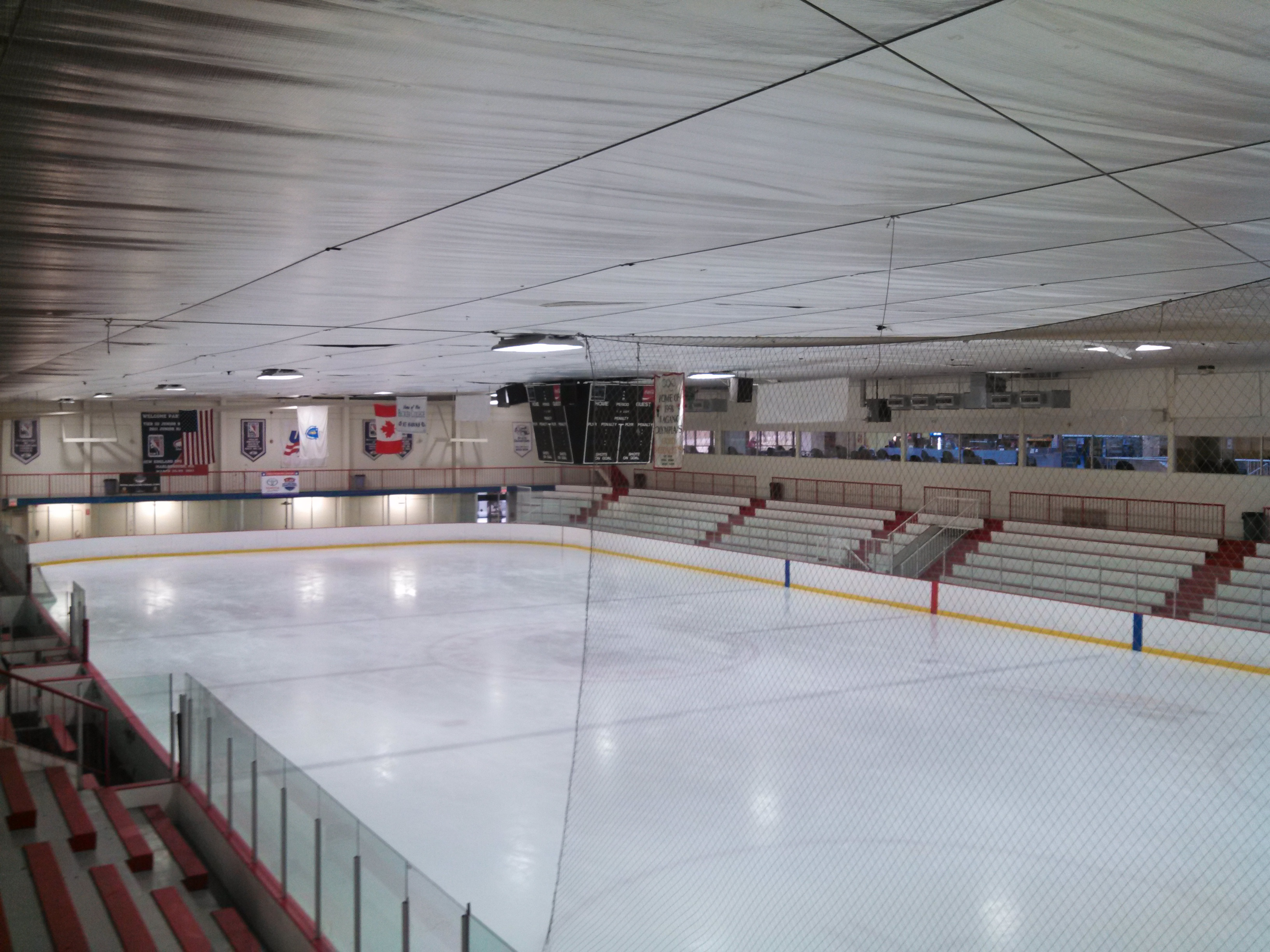
- Rink 1
- Interactive map of New England Sports Center
- Address: 121 Donald Lynch Blvd, Marlborough, MA, 01752
- Owner: H. Larue Renfroe
- Operator: New England Sports Management
- Capacity: 1,800 (Rink 1); 60 (Rinks 2-8)
- Type: Ice Rink Complex
- Surface: 200 ft x 85 ft (Rinks 1-8)
- Acreage: 22.3

Construction
- Built: 1994
- Expanded: 2004, 2010, 2017

Tenants
- Providence Bruins (Note: Temporary location during the 2020–21 season.); Minuteman Flames; Boston Junior Bruins; Central Mass Outlaws; 495 Stars; Hudson High School; Nashoba Regional High School; Lincoln-Sudbury Regional High School; Hopkinton High School; Northbridge High School; St. John's High School; Hillside School; Anna Maria College AMCATS; Skating Club of Boston Metrowest; Center Skating Academy

Website
- www.nes.com

The New England Sports Center is a two-story, eight-rink ice-skating facility located in Marlborough, Massachusetts. Covering 22.3 acres (90,000 m^{2}) of suburban land, the 220,000-square-foot (20,000 m^{2}) building has over 65 locker rooms, a hockey pro shop, ice skate sharpening, ice skate rentals, function rooms, a full-service restaurant, and a snack bar. In addition to the eight full-size rinks, the facility has two miniature ice surfaces, Rinks 9 and 10. Host to the Haydenettes, home to the Skating Club of Boston Metrowest, the Minuteman Flames, Central Mass. Outlaws, and the Junior Bruins hockey teams, the New England Sports Center is noteworthy for having more ice-skating surfaces than any other arena in the New England area.

== History ==
Construction of the original four rinks (Rinks 1-4) of the New England Sports Center on previously undeveloped land was completed in November 1994. An additional fifth rink (Rink 5) was completed in September 2004.

Plans for the addition of a sixth full-size ice-skating surface and a partial-surface practice rink were approved by the City of Marlborough in April 2010. and the full-size Rink 6 opened for operation on December 4, 2010. The miniature Rink 7, which has since been re-designated as Rink 9, opened in January 2011, and is used primarily for goaltender training and player training.

The Marlborough City Council approved plans to expand the center yet again in June 2016. This expansion added two more full-sized rinks, as well as an additional miniature rink. The new rinks were built partially on newly acquired land to the west of the preexisting facility. Rink 7 opened on September 23, 2017, and Rink 8 opened on October 1, 2017. The additional miniature rink, designated Rink 10, opened in early December 2017.

== Providence Bruins 2021 season ==
On January 4, 2021, the Providence Bruins announced that they would be playing their entire 2021 American Hockey League season at NESC. The Bruins made the move due to the ongoing COVID-19 pandemic and that their arena, the Dunkin' Donuts Center had been turned into a Coronavirus testing center. Team owner H. Larue Renfroe also owns all of NESC. The team plans to return to Rhode Island for the upcoming 2021-22 season. It marks the first time in over 100 years that there would be zero Rhode Island Professional sports teams playing a season.

== Management ==
The facility was constructed at the direction of and is owned by Larue Renfroe, current owner of the AHL Providence Bruins. and founder of ATC Corporation The current facility manager is Jason Silbor.

== Events and alumni ==
Because the New England Sports Center has ten ice surfaces, it has the ability to host larger organizations and has hosted events of national and international importance, as well as playing host to Olympic figure-skating hopefuls and hockey players of all ages and abilities.

In the past, the rink has served as a practice rink for Olympic medal winners Ilia Kulik, Evgeny Platov, and Pasha Grishuk.

The proximity to Worcester and the regular availability of ice time made the New England Sports Center an alternate practice area for the AHL Worcester Sharks, (relocated in 2015 to San Jose, CA and renamed San Jose Barracuda).

The New England Sports Center has hosted the Massachusetts State Hockey Coaches Association annual Garrett Reagan High School Hockey Summit since 2008 (the Hockey Summit pits as many as sixty high school teams against each other in 30-minute mini-games).

The 2003 USA Hockey Tier III Junior National Championship were held at the New England Sports Center. The Tier III Junior "B" championships were held there in 2008, 2009, 2010, and 2011.

Starting in January 2012, the New England Sports Center was the home venue of the now-defunct Boston Rockhoppers professional indoor lacrosse team.

=== Disabled hockey ===
The New England Sports Center hosted the 2008 IPC Ice Sledge Hockey World Championships and the 2008 International Standing Amputee divisional match-up, part of the Annual USA Disabled Festival, described as "...the largest disabled hockey event ever..." by Dr. David Crandell, president of the American Amputee Hockey Association. Thirty-four teams were present during the 2008 event, representing the four divisions of USA Hockey's disabled section - sled hockey, special hockey, hard of hearing or deaf, and standing amputee.

"...I still get inspired by it myself," said festival co-chairman Rick Fask. "People who have never seen disabled athletes perform at this level, it's inspiring. It should say to a lot of people that whatever ability you have, you can accomplish it all. We hope that the impact on the community is more awareness for any disability. That's what we hope to get out of it."

== Economic contribution ==
The New England Sports Center has been described by the Marlborough Regional Chamber of Commerce as " ... one of the greatest economic contributors for the businesses in this region ... " to the hospitality industry, with economic benefits accruing to the " ... local hotels, restaurants, retail establishments, and gas stations ... ".

" ... (i)t's a great boon for the community," said Arthur Vigeant, president of the Marlborough City Council. "The hotel rooms and the restaurants are filled when (the New England Sports Center) has one of (their) big tournaments."

== Facility operation ==
The New England Sports Center is principally an ice-skating facility, and most operational aspects center on ice-making and air conditioning.

=== Refrigeration system ===
The New England Sports Center uses a brine/ammonia indirect refrigeration system to cool the concrete surface underlying the skating surface. Brine chilled to between 18 °F (−8 °C) and 20 °F (−7 °C) loops between the skating surfaces and an anhydrous ammonia refrigeration system.

There are two separate compressor systems in use at the New England Sports Center: the Primary System, which cools Rinks 1-6 and Rink 9, and the Secondary System, which cools the rinks constructed during the summer of 2017 (Rinks 7, 8, and 10).

The Primary consists of two "sleds", each of which consists of three compressors. The compressors (a total of six) are Cimco Lewis 300 horsepower (220 kW) model C6-WO6A compressors. There are two evaporative cooling towers at the rear of the building. The evaporative cooling towers are Evapco model LSCA430; the towers were replaced for the first time in August 2009.

In simple terms, the ammonia portion of the system functions like an oversized household refrigerator. The brine passes through the "refrigerator" and is cooled to well below the freezing point of fresh water - but the brine does not freeze because it's not fresh water, it's salt water (calcium chloride as opposed to the more commonly known sodium chloride).

When the ammonia in the refrigeration loop is compressed, energy is released in the form of heat. When the ammonia is allowed to expand, heat is absorbed from the brine loop. The cold brine (now at 18 °F (−8 °C) to 20 °F) is circulated under the concrete rink floor.

Counter-intuituvely, hot water (typically 150 °F (66 °C) to 160 °F) is used to make new ice. Hot water has a lower oxygen content, and makes clearer, harder ice. The hot water also flows better across the frozen surface, smoothing gouges and filling holes. The ice-making water is untreated City of Marlborough tap water.

In an effort to save energy, the New England Sports Center recycles not water (which would be unsanitary), but heat. When the Zamboni ice resurfacer makes a sheet of ice, a quantity of ice shavings are cut from the surface of the ice. The collected ice shavings are melted by the heat released during the compression of the anhydrous ammonia. Prior to discharge to the sanitary sewer system, the melted ice shavings are used to help chill the water which flows into the evaporation towers to cool the anhydrous ammonia.

=== Cogeneration units ===
In early 2011, three Tecogen CM-75 cogeneration units were installed at the rear (north-facing side) of the building. These three units generate electricity (for on-site use) and hot water. At full capacity the three cogeneration units are insufficient to meet facility hot water demands, but serve as a supplement for the natural-gas-fueled boiler system.

=== Resurfacers ===
The New England Sports Center uses battery-powered Zamboni model 552 ice resurfacers for its full size rinks. There are currently nine machines at the facility, six to eight of which may be in use at any one time while remaining machines undergo repairs. The endurance of the machines varies, but a fully charged Zamboni model 552 can be expected to make between 10 and 12 sheets of ice before requiring a recharge.

Rink 9 is resurfaced using a Design Form Show-Ice 3B electric ice resurfacer, and Rink 10 is resurfaced using a SportIce Bumblebee electric ice resurfacer.

=== Food service ===
The New England Sports Center has two food service areas. The primary food service area (the Starlight Grill) functions during normal working hours and offers typical fast-food fare such as burgers and pizzas, as well as fresh salads, soups, coffee, soft drinks, and fruit juices. On-site catering for special events is also available. A fresh seafood restaurant (New England Seafood), which opened in 2015, is only open during select tournaments. Alcohol is available (except during high school games), but can only be consumed in the restaurant areas.

=== Off-ice physical conditioning room ===
The New England Sports Center has a large, carpeted, glass-wall exercise room located on the second floor between Rink 2 and Rink 5. Previously used for seminars, semi-formal events, business meetings, and as a scouting area, the space was converted to a physical fitness area in 2013.

== New England Figure Skating Club ==
The New England Figure Skating Club (NEFSC) served as the focus for figure-skating activities at the New England Sports Center until it disbanded in 2009.

== Skating Club of Boston ==
The Skating Club of Boston Metrowest synchronized skating team Team Excel, coached by Merita Mullen, practices at the New England Sports Center on a weekly basis.
