= Charlotte Copperheads =

American indoor lacrosse team

- Founded: 2012
- League: Professional Lacrosse League
- Based in: Charlotte, North Carolina
- Arena: Bojangles' Coliseum
- Colors: Red, gold, black, white
- Owner: Graham D'Alvia
- Head coach: Tom Ryan
- General manager: Tom Ryan
- Local media: The Charlotte Observer
- Website: www.charlottecopperheads.com

The Charlotte Copperheads were an American professional indoor lacrosse team based in Charlotte, North Carolina. They are a charter member of the Professional Lacrosse League (PLL) and began play in the 2012 season with their home games at the Bojangles' Coliseum.

== History ==
The Copperheads are Charlotte's second indoor lacrosse team; the Charlotte Cobras of the Major Indoor Lacrosse League (now known as the National Lacrosse League) played a single season at the Coliseum (when it was known as the Independence Arena) in 1996 before folding. The Cobras maintain the dubious distinction of being the only EPBLL/MILL/NLL team to finish an imperfect season, going 0–10 in their only season. Charlotte has also been granted expansion in the outdoor lacrosse league (MLL) for the 2012 MLL Season, and are named the Charlotte Hounds.

The franchise was announced in 2011 as the second of five founding members in the upstart North American Lacrosse League, which hoped to start play in January 2012. On December 31, 2011, Charlotte and four of the five other teams announced the NALL had fired its acting commissioner and would move to a fall schedule. This led to a rift in the league that was settled in court, with the fall faction forming the Professional Lacrosse League.

The Copperheads began play in September 2012 with a road win against the Jacksonville Bullies. Their inaugural season concludes on December 1. The PLL has since folded. This has caused the Copperheads to no longer exist.

== Name-the-team contest ==
The Copperheads name was decided through a name-the-team contest-after various submissions, the official team name will be decided via a 16-nomination bracket from the top submissions. Notably, three of the finalists (Charge, Legion, Monarchs) were runners-up for the name-the-team contest which ultimately decided the Charlotte Hounds name for the city's 2012 Major League Lacrosse team.

=== Bracket ===
First Round
Charlotte Nitro
Charlotte Cougars
Charlotte Fuel
Charlotte Copperheads
Charlotte Monarchs
Charlotte Charge
Charlotte Legion
Charlotte Bricklayers
Charlotte Mavericks
Charlotte Coyotes
Charlotte Flight
Charlotte Miners
Charlotte Torque
Charlotte Tide
Charlotte Energy
Charlotte Rev

Quarterfinals
Charlotte Cougars
Charlotte Copperheads
Charlotte Monarchs
Charlotte Legion
Charlotte Mavericks
Charlotte Miners
Charlotte Torque
Charlotte Energy

Semifinals
Charlotte Copperheads
Charlotte Legion
Charlotte Miners
Charlotte Torque

Finals
Charlotte Copperheads
Charlotte Torque

== Roster ==
2012 Charlotte Copperheads
Number	Player's Name	Nationality	Position	College	Height	Weight
1	Brad Conlon	(United States)	G	RIT	6 ft 1 in	221 lb
2	Alex Burkhead	(United States)	D	Roanoke	6 ft 1 in	190 lb
3	Ethan Farrell	(United States)	F	Lynchburg	6 ft 0 in	190 lb
6	Greg Watterson	(United States)	D	Wingate	6 ft 2 in	220 lb
10	Mark Burnett (lacrosse)	(United States)	T	Mars Hill	5 ft 9 in	145 lb
11	Matt Smalley	(United States)	F	Hobart	5 ft 9 in	180 lb
12	Thomas Langan (lacrosse)	(United States)	T	Limestone	6 ft 0 in	190 lb
14	Greg Rogowski	(United States)	F	Merrimack	5 ft 9 in	165 lb
16	Brian Welch	(United States)	T	Le Moyne	6 ft 0 in	194 lb
17	Brekan Kohlitz	(United States)	T	Michigan	6 ft 1 in	185 lb
19	Jack Delligatti	(United States)	D	Greensboro Day	6 ft 0 in	188 lb
20	Ryan Hotaling	(United States)	T	Nazareth	6 ft 2 in	211 lb
21	Sam Bradman	(United States)	T	Salisbury	6 ft 0 in	165 lb
23	Kevin Iwanusa	(United States)	O	Pfeiffer	5 ft 9 in	148 lb
27	Mike O'Brien	(United States)	D	Hobart	6 ft 0 in	203 lb
28	Erik Holt	(United States)	D	Penn State	6 ft 3 in	235 lb
33	Craig Rosecrans	(United States)	T	Le Moyne	6 ft 2 in	215 lb
37	Nick Cotter	(Canada)	F	Dowling	5 ft 11 in	190 lb
42	Adam Nauerth (lacrosse)	(United States)	T	Nazareth	6 ft 1 in	208 lb
45	Mike Bedford	(United States)	D	C.W Post	6 ft 1 in	205 lb
48	Tory Stevens	(United States)	G	Recent Team: Newtown (Can-Am League)	5 ft 11 in	252 lb
49	Matt Hickman	(United States)	O	Salisbury	5 ft 7 in	208 lb
61	Peter Milliman	(United States)	F	Gettysburg	5 ft 10 in	215 lb

== Season-by-season ==
Charlotte Copperheads
Year	W	L
2012	5	1	2012 Regular Season Win % = .833
Totals	5	1	Regular Season Win % = 833.
