= Pennsylvania Shamrocks =

- Founded: 2011
- Colors: Kelly green, orange, hunter green, cream
- Owner: Joe DeLuca, Jim Jennings, John "Jack" Manzella, Aaron Musselman, Anthony "Chip" Santye, Ron Costello and Tom Cataldo
- Head coach: Barry Powless
- General manager: TBD

The Pennsylvania Shamrocks were an American professional indoor lacrosse team based in Pennsylvania. They were a charter member of the Professional Lacrosse League (PLL). They were previously known as the Wilkes-Barre/Scranton Shamrocks and planned to play in the Wilkes-Barre/Scranton area before losing their lease to the Mohegan Sun Arena at Casey Plaza.

== History ==
A franchise of the upstart North American Lacrosse League based in the Wilkes-Barre/Scranton, Pennsylvania area was announced in June 2011, the first of five total teams announced. The name and logos were announced on July 14, 2011 at the Woodlands Inn & Resort in Wilkes-Barre, Pennsylvania. Jim Jennings, former commissioner of the National Lacrosse League is the owner and team president of the club. They were initially scheduled to play in the Mohegan Sun Arena at Casey Plaza.

On December 31, 2011, Wilkes-Barre/Scranton and three of the four other teams announced the NALL had fired its acting commissioner and would move to a fall schedule. This measure led to a rift in the organization that was resolved in court, with the fall faction organizing as the Professional Lacrosse League. On February 6, 2012, the Luzerne County Convention Center Authority announced it has terminated the agreement for the Shamrocks to play in the Mohegan Sun Arena. Now known as the Pennsylvania Shamrocks, the team is reportedly seeking a new venue for the 2012 season.
