= LXM Pro Tour =

- Sport: Field lacrosse
- Founded: 2009
- First season: 2010
- Folded: 2014
- No. of teams: 2
- Broadcaster: The Lacrosse Network

LXM Pro Tour, or LXM Pro, was a California-based professional men's field lacrosse showcase that featured many of the sport's most accomplished players. LXM Pro Tour was founded by former college lacrosse and Major League Lacrosse players, notably former Johns Hopkins star Kyle Harrison

The tour competed for the top collegiate and professional players with the more established MLL. LXM Pro and MLL announced a partnership in 2014, with the LXM Pro Tour moving their events to the MLL off-season and in new markets. However, LXM Pro didn't hold any tour stops after the announcement.

== History ==
LXM Pro was founded in late 2009 by former college All-Americans and professional players Scott Hochstadt, Craig Hochstadt, Xander Ritz, Max Ritz, and Kyle Harrison. Founding partner, Rich Fiore of Las Vegas, joined the team as lead investor and died in his sleep only days after LXM Pro's inaugural event.

In 2010 LXM Pro hosted four events, LXM 512 in Austin, LXM Pro Launch Party at the NCAA Final Four, LXM 610 in Philadelphia, and LXM 904 in Jacksonville.

In 2011 LXM Pro staged another four events, returning to Orange County, California for LXM 949, LXM 410 in Towson, Maryland, LXM 610 back in Philadelphia, Pennsylvania, and LXM 702 in Las Vegas, Nevada to cap off the second full year of events. All-American twin midfielders Shamel and Rhamel Bratton, from the University of Virginia, announced they had made the decision to opt for LXM over the MLL.

In 2012 Division III superstar Sam Bradman made an unexpected decision to play on the LXM Pro Tour after having been drafted by the Long Island Lizards of the MLL. 8 games were played plus three promotional events were held by LXM, including a Launch Party in Los Angeles and the 3rd Annual LXM Pro Final Four Party.

The schedule for the 2013 LXM Pro Tour held 9 pro games and club team tournaments over the span of June through December. LXM partnered with Adrenaline Lacrosse to turn LXM event stops in tournaments for club teams, training sessions players, and other fan friendly events like autograph sessions with players. Also, former Syracuse star Tim Desko announced he would join the LXM Pro Tour in, though he had been drafted by Charlotte Hounds of the MLL just weeks prior.

Comedic movie star Peter Dante, who played lacrosse in as a child in Connecticut and at Hofstra University, is heavily involved with LXM Pro as a coach and its youth lacrosse programs on game days. Dante's passion for the sport, and LXM specifically, has helped bring awareness to the sport of lacrosse.

On February 13, 2014, the MLL and Adrenaline (the parent company of the LXM Pro Tour) announced they had formed a partnership. This partnership includes Adrenaline becoming the (non-exclusive) sock provider, (exclusive) sideline hat, and (exclusive) shooting shirt supplier of the league. More importantly, this partnership allowed MLL players to play in the LXM Pro Tour and vice versa. Because of this, the LXM Pro Tour events were moved to the MLL off season (September through March).

== MLL Comparison ==
Major League Lacrosse was founded in 1999 as a more "nontraditional" style of field lacrosse. Main differences in MLL are the use of a shot clock and a two-point-goal line. LXM Pro is more "traditional" in their approach to game play. Field lines match the lines of standard lacrosse field. LXM features no two point goal or "hard" shot clock, similar to NCAA lacrosse.

Like the MLL, LXM Pro Tour did allow dive shots. The dive shot (without an attacking player being pushed from behind) was disallowed in 1999 in NCAA lacrosse to help protect goalies.

== Past Events ==
Event name	Date	City/Area	Winning team	Score	Losing team
LXM/ATS 805	January 18, 2014	Los Angeles	Team STX	19-18 (OT)	Maverik United
LXM PRO 858	January 4, 2014	San Diego	Team STX	16-15	Maverik United
LXM/ATS 321	December 14, 2013	Cocoa	Team STX	19-13	Maverik United
LXM/ATS 702	December 7, 2013	Las Vegas	Maverik United	13-12	Team STX
LXM/ATS 214	November 9, 2013	Dallas	Team STX	10-9	Maverik United
LXM/ATS 404	October 26, 2013	Atlanta	Team STX	12-9	Maverik United
LXM/ATS 916	October 5, 2013	Sacramento	Team STX	12-10	Maverik United
LXM/ATS 801	September 28, 2013	Orem	Maverik United	20-19	Team STX
LXM/ATS 312	July 20, 2013	Chicago	Maverik United	17-11	Team STX
LXM/ATS 619	June 22, 2013	San Diego	Team STX	21-16	Maverik United
LXM/ATS 949	June 8, 2013	Orange County	Team STX	14-13	Maverik United
LXM/ATS 702	December 1, 2012	Las Vegas	Team STX	22-20	Team Sole
LXM/ATS 602	November 10, 2012	Phoenix	Team STX	16-10	Team Sole
LXM/ATS 801	September 29, 2012	Salt Lake City	Team STX	16-14	Team Sole
LXM/ATS 206	August 5, 2012	Seattle	Team Sole	15-14 (OT)	Team STX
LXM/ATS 619	June 23, 2012	Coronado	Team STX	17-14	Team Sole
LXM/ATS 949	June 3, 2012	San Diego	Team Sole	14-13	Team STX
LXM 702	December 3, 2011	Las Vegas	Team STX	10-8	Team Headwrapz East
LXM 610	October, 2011	Philadelphia	Team Cascade	15-13	Team STX
LXM 410	July 2, 2011	Baltimore	Team Nitro	11-10 (OT)	Team Blur
LXM 904	October 16, 2010	Jacksonville	Team New Balance	10-9	Team Monster Energy
LXM 610	August 28, 2010	Philadelphia	Team Monster	10-9	Team New Balance
LXM 512	April 10, 2010	Austin	Team Cascade	16-9	Luminous Capital
