= Boston Rockhoppers =

- Founded: 2012
- Based in: Marlborough, Massachusetts
- Arena: New England Sports Center
- Colors: Blue, Orange, Yellow, White
- Head coach: Jack Piatelli
- General manager: Anthony Fitti
- Championships: 2012
- Website: bostonrockhoppers.com

The Boston Rockhoppers were an American indoor lacrosse team based in Marlborough, Massachusetts. Formerly a North American Lacrosse League member, the Rockhoppers played their home games at New England Sports Center.

On June 18, 2013, the Rockhoppers and the rest of the North American Lacrosse League announced that they would suspend operations.

== History ==
The franchise was announced as an expansion member of the North American Lacrosse League on January 14, 2012.

Originally scheduled to be a 2013 expansion team, due to initial struggles and as a result of the NALL and PLL split, the Rockhoppers moved up their first season to 2012.

On March 2, 2012, the Rockhoppers faced-off against the Kentucky Stickhorses in the first game between two NALL franchises. The Stickhorses won 19–14.

The two teams opened the 2013 season, with the Rockhoppers winning 10–9.

After leading the league in goals per game with 16, they played in the championship game against the Kentucky Stickhorses.

== 2013 Roster ==
2013 Boston Rockhoppers
Number	Player's Name	Position	College	Height	Weight
1	Malcolm Chase IIIII	D	Whittier
2	Tim Fallon	F	Hartford
13	Cameron Lao-Gosney	T	Lehigh
14	Jon Hayes	D	Western New England
15	Peter Vlahakis	F	Fairfield	5 ft 10 in
16	Ryan Hoffmeister	F	Hartwick
17	Andrew Kirkaldy	F	Gordon
18	Greg Paul	F
21	Ethan Vedder	D	Cornell
24	Matt Levesque	T	Skidmore
40	Kyle Barnett	D
41	Mike Stone	F	Middlebury
44	Greg Rogowski	F	Merrimack
50	Marty Bowes	T	Hartford
50	Steve Kennedy	T	Clarkson
55	Tom Palasek	F	Syracuse
60	Ryan Hotaling	T	Nazareth
65	Nick Schroeder	G
66	Lantz Carter	T	Salisbury
44	Colton Vosburgh	T	Penn. State
70	Roman Lao-Gosney	T	Lehigh
77	Steve Trocki	F	St. Anselm
80	TJ Dahill	F	Wentworth
88	Vincent Talbot	G
	Mike Vergano	G
	Chris Hettler	G

== 2013 Schedule ==
2013 Boston Rockhoppers Season
Date & Time	Away team	Score	Home team	Score	Game Notes
January 5 @ 7:00 PM	Boston	10	Kentucky Stickhorses	9
January 12 @ 7:00 PM	Baltimore Bombers	17	Boston	16	Overtime
January 19 @ 7:00 PM	Kentucky Stickhorses	9	Boston	16
January 27 @ 3:00 PM	Boston	20	Baltimore Bombers	9
February 2 @ 7:00 PM	Rhode Island Kingfish	7	Boston	20
February 17 @ 3:00 PM	Boston	18	Baltimore Bombers	9
February 23 @ 7:00 PM	Rhode Island Kingfish	14	Boston	15	Postponed until March 9
March 2 @ 7:00 PM	Boston	16	Kentucky Stickhorses	13
March 9 @ 7:00 PM✝	Kentucky Stickhorses	N/A	Boston	N/A	CANCELED
March 16 @ 7:00 PM✝	Baltimore Bombers	N/A	Boston	N/A	CANCELED

✝ Games canceled to Baltimore Bombers mid-season fold.
