= Freedom Hall =

Indoor arena in Louisville, Kentucky

Coordinates: 38°12′1.06″N 85°44′30.79″W

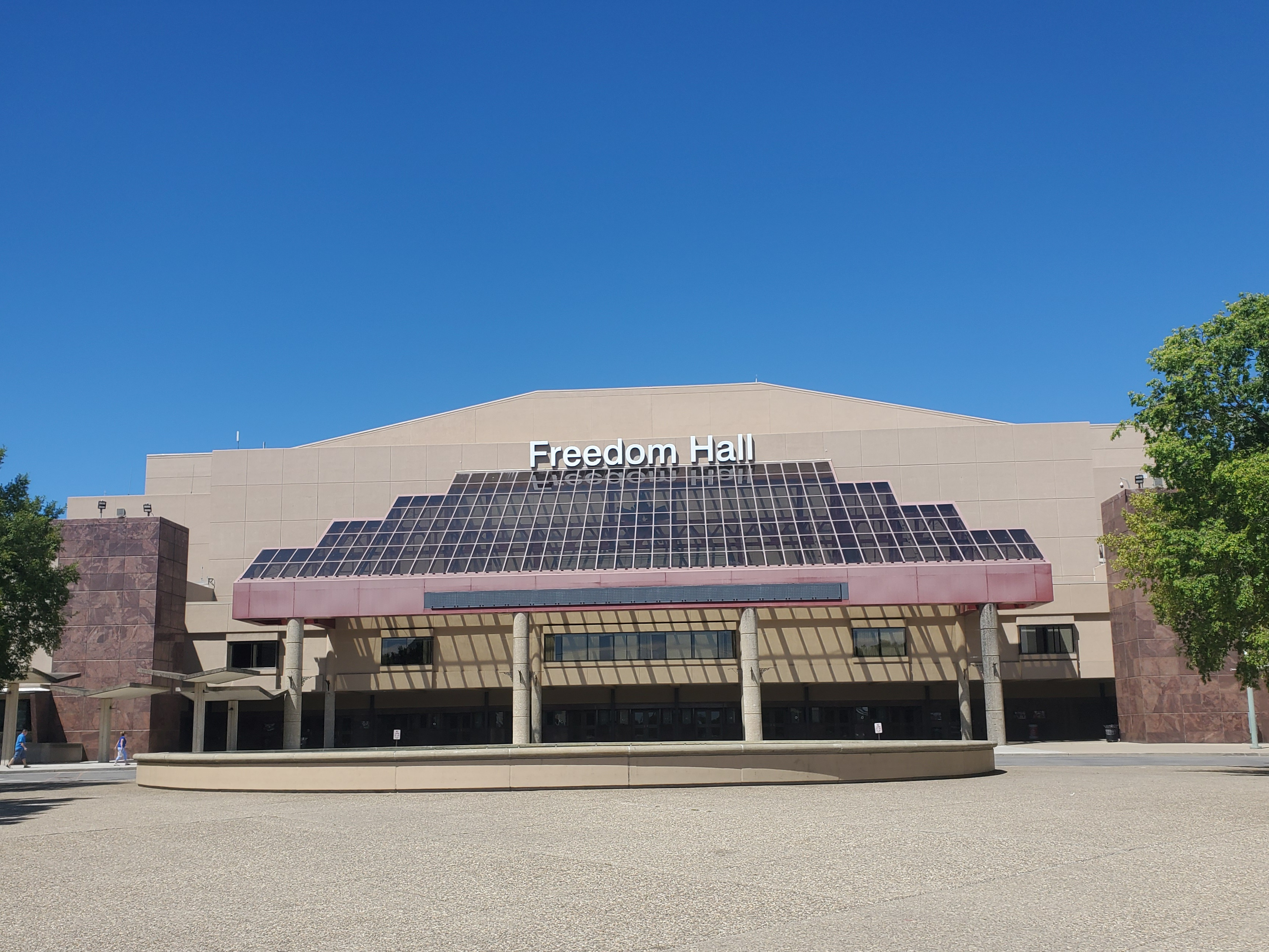
- Freedom Hall in 2024
- Interactive map of Freedom Hall
- Location: 937 Phillips Lane, Louisville, Kentucky
- Owner: Kentucky State Fair Board
- Operator: Kentucky State Fair Board
- Capacity: 18,865 (basketball); 19,200 (concerts)

Construction
- Opened: 1956
- Expanded: 1984

Tenants
- Louisville Cardinals men's basketball (NCAA) (1956–2010); Louisville Rebels (IHL) (1957–1960); Kentucky Colonels (ABA) (1970–1976); Louisville Cardinals women's basketball (NCAA) (1975–2010); Louisville Panthers (AHL) (1999–2001); Louisville Fire (af2) (2001–2008); Kentucky Stickhorses (NALL) (2012–2013); Kentucky Xtreme (CIFL) (2013–2014); Bellarmine Knights men's basketball (NCAA) (2020–2024); Bellarmine Knights women's basketball (NCAA) (2020–2024)

Website
- kyexpo.org

Freedom Hall is a multi-purpose arena in Louisville, Kentucky, on the grounds of the Kentucky Exposition Center, which is owned by the Kentucky State Fair Board. It is best known for its use as a basketball arena, previously serving as the home of the University of Louisville Cardinals and, from 2020 to 2024, as the home of the Bellarmine University Knights. It has hosted Kiss, the Grateful Dead (who played there on four dates), Chicago, AC/DC, WWE events, Mötley Crüe, Elvis Presley, The Doors, Janis Joplin, Creed, Led Zeppelin, Van Halen, Michael Jackson, Coldplay and many more. As well as the Louisville Cardinals men's basketball team from 1956 to 2010, the arena's tenants included the Kentucky Colonels of the American Basketball Association from 1970 until the ABA–NBA merger in June 1976, and the Louisville Cardinals women's team from its inception in 1975 to 2010. The Kentucky Stickhorses of the North American Lacrosse League used Freedom Hall from 2011 until the team folded in 2013. From 2015 to 2019 it has hosted the VEX Robotics Competition World Championship Finals yearly in mid-April.

The arena lost its status as Kentuckiana's main indoor sporting and concert venue when the downtown KFC Yum! Center opened in 2010. It is still used regularly, however, hosting concerts, horse shows, conventions, and basketball games.

== History ==
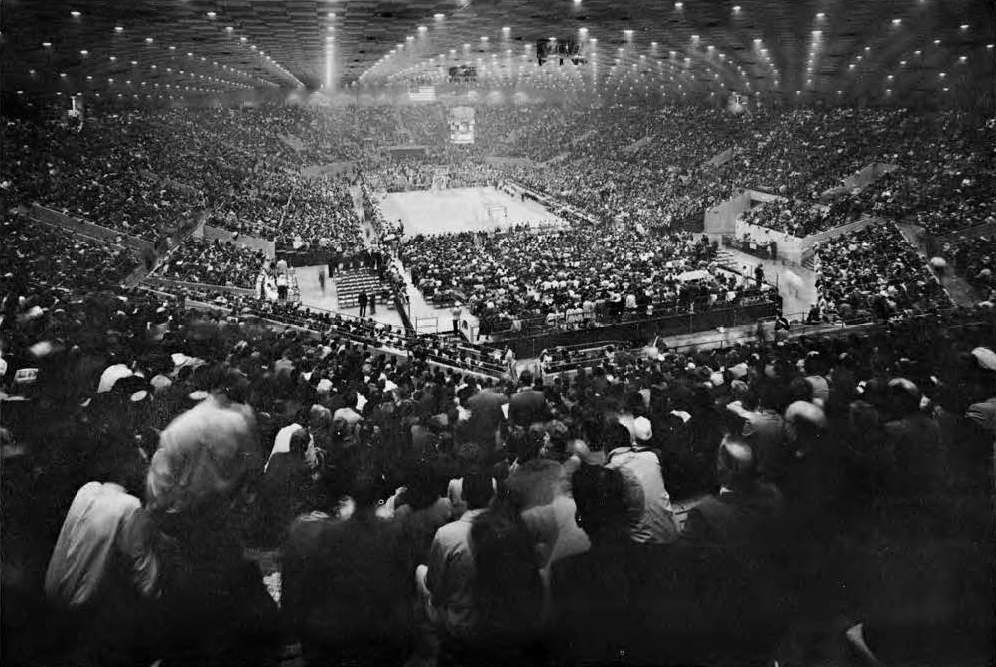
Interior of Freedom Hall, c. 1963

Freedom Hall was completed in 1956 in the newly opened Kentucky Fair and Exposition Center located 5 miles (8.0 km) south of Downtown Louisville. It received its name as the result of a statewide essay contest sponsored by the State Fair Board and the American Legion. Charlotte Owens, a senior at DuPont Manual High School, submitted the winning entry over 6,500 others. Designed for the nation's premier equestrian competition, the Kentucky State Fair World's Championship Horse Show, the floor length and permanent seating were designed specifically for the almost 300-foot (91 m)-long show ring (in comparison, a regulation hockey rink is 200 feet (61 m) long, and a basketball court is only 94 feet). The North American International Livestock Exposition also is held there each November. Muhammad Ali fought his first professional fight at Freedom Hall when he won a six-round decision over Tunney Hunsaker. Freedom Hall was also one of the major stops on the Motortown (later MOTOWN) traveling music revue during the early and mid-1960s.

During the 1974 Super Outbreak, an F4 tornado touched down at the Kentucky Fair and Exposition Center, causing a partial collapse of the roof of Freedom Hall. The damage resulted in the ABA cancelling a Kentucky Colonels playoff game that was scheduled to be played the day the tornado hit. Grateful Dead played Freedom Hall 4 times including 6/18/74, 4/9/89, 6/15/93, and 6/16/93. 6/18/74 was officially released as Road Trips Volume 2 Number 3.

Judgment Day (2000) was also held at the Freedom Hall. A collegiate wrestling tournament was held at the arena in 2019.

Freedom Hall has hosted campaign rallies for two U.S. presidents: John F. Kennedy and Donald Trump.

== Tenant history ==
The Kentucky Colonels fielded successful teams during their tenure at Freedom Hall, winning the American Basketball Association (ABA) Championship in the 1974–75 season and reaching the ABA Finals two other times. The 1970–71 team played in the ABA Championship Finals, losing to the Utah Stars in 7 games. The 1972–73 team advanced to the Finals again, losing to the Indiana Pacers in 7 games. The Colonels were disbanded when the ABA merged with the National Basketball Association in 1976. Hall of Fame players Louie Dampier, Dan Issel and Artis Gilmore played for the Colonels during their successful run. Hall of Fame Coach Hubie Brown coached the Colonels Championship team.

In 1984 the facility was refurbished, including lowering the floor to allow maximum capacity to increase from 16,664 to 18,865 for basketball. It was the full-time home of Cardinal men's basketball from the 1957–58 season to 2010, with the team winning 82% of home games in 50+ seasons. The University of Louisville was ranked in the Top 5 in attendance for the past 25 years, with 16 of the last 19 years averaging more than 100% of capacity.

In addition to being the home of the Cardinals, Freedom Hall has hosted NCAA tournament games ten times, including six Final Fours between 1958 and 1969. The arena has also hosted 11 conference tournaments, nine Metro Conference Tournaments and two Conference USA tournaments—2001 and 2003. It has also hosted the Kentucky Boys' High School State Basketball Tournament (also known as the Sweet 16) 23 times, including every year from 1965 to 1978. In 1984, the floor of the arena was lowered about 10 feet (3.0 m) to increase the capacity of the arena from 16,613 to its current figure. In the 1996–97 season Freedom Hall averaged an attendance of 19,590, well surpassing arena capacity. Freedom Hall hosts the Championship tractor pull every February during the National Farm Machinery Show.

From 2001 to 2008, the arena football team Louisville Fire of the af2 played in Freedom Hall before ceasing operations.

On the lower level is the Kentucky Athletic Hall of Fame where an engraved bronze plaque honors each inductee.

The University of Louisville men's basketball team played their final game at Freedom Hall in front of a record crowd of 20,138 on March 6, 2010, against Syracuse University, the #1 ranked team in the nation. Louisville won in an upset 78–68.

The arena began to gain new tenants in 2012 with the addition of the Kentucky Stickhorses, and in 2013, with the addition of the Kentucky Xtreme. However, the Kentucky Stickhorses folded in 2014 after the lack of wins and the lack of attendance. The Kentucky Xtreme were suspended mid-season with other teams playing the remainder of their season. In 2020, the Bellarmine University Knights selected Freedom Hall as their home for men's and women's basketball, and played there for four seasons before returning home games to the on-campus Knights Hall effective in 2024–25.

== Gallery ==
UofL Men's Basketball Attendance by Year
Year	Average attendance	Games	Percent of capacity
1997/98	18,669	14	98.96%
1998/99	19,055	14	101.0%
1999/00	19,180	15	101.2%
2000/01	17,457	16	92.53%
2001/02	18,929	19	100.3%
2002/03	19,037	18	101.0%
2003/04	19,443	15	103.1%
2004/05	18,746	17	99.36%
2005/06	18,316	22	97.09%
2006/07	18,488	20	98%
2007/08	19,481	17	103.3%

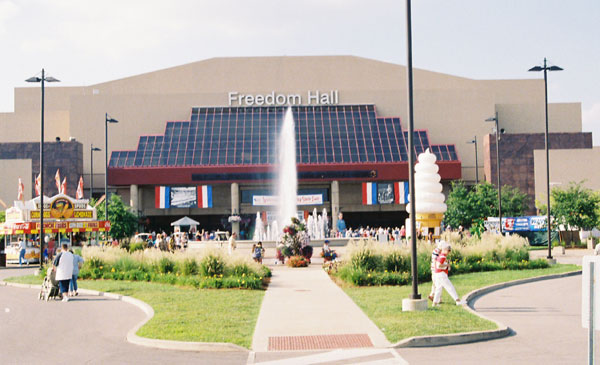
Freedom Hall at a distance

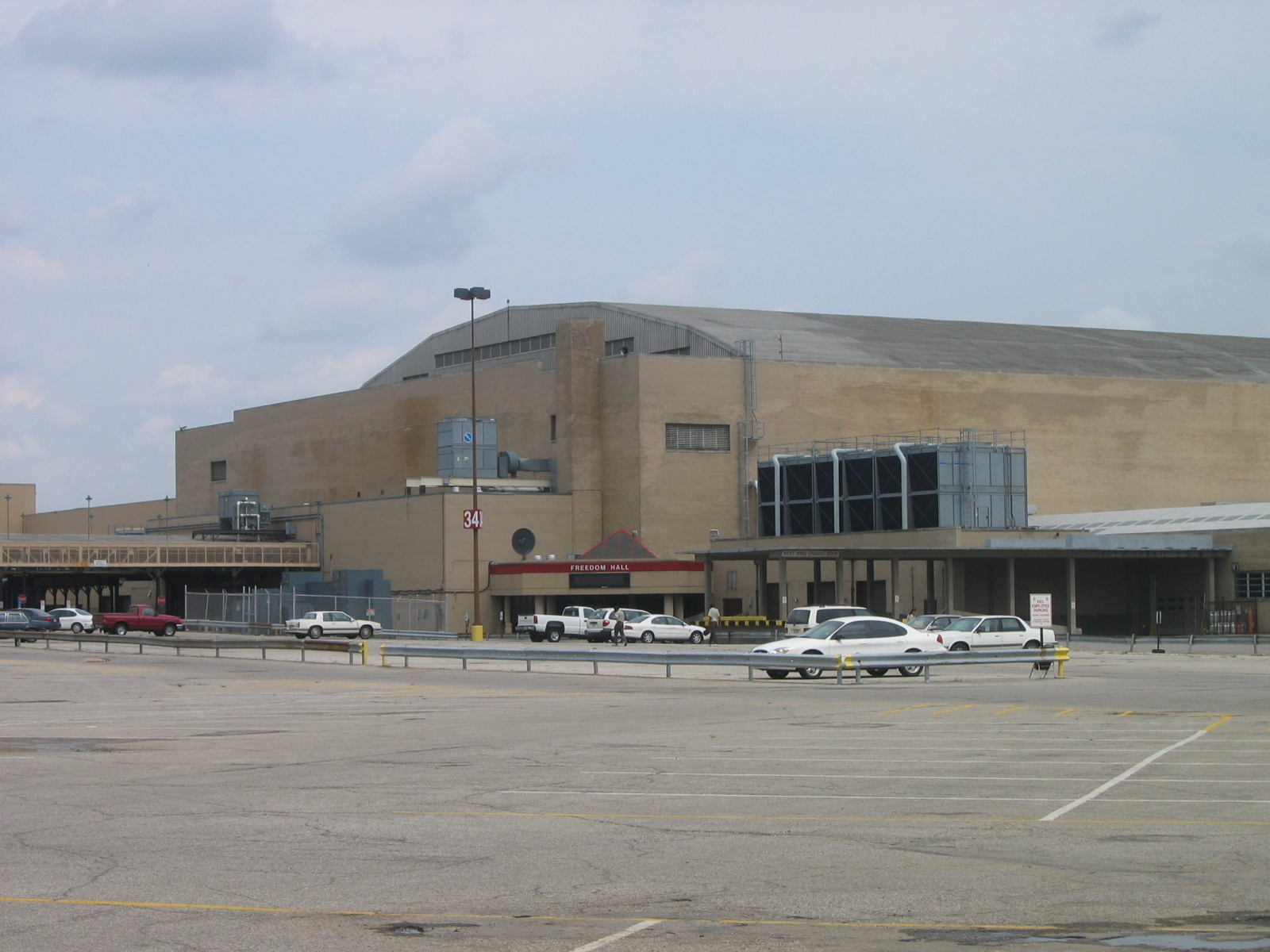
Rear side of Freedom Hall

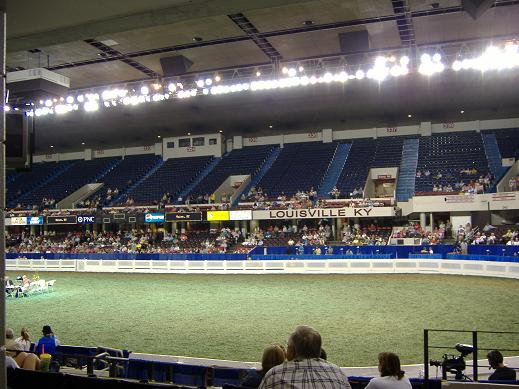
Interior of Freedom Hall

== See also ==
- List of events at Freedom Hall
- KFC Yum! Center
- Sports in Louisville, Kentucky
- List of attractions and events in the Louisville metropolitan area
