= Baltimore Bombers (lacrosse) =

Former semi-professional indoor lacrosse team

- Based in: Baltimore, Maryland
- Arena: Clarence H. "Du" Burns Arena
- Colors: Red, Black, Gold, White
- Head coach: Hunter Francis
- General manager: Hunter Francis

The Baltimore Bombers were an American indoor lacrosse team based in Baltimore, Maryland. They were a member of the North American Lacrosse League. The Bombers played their home games at Clarence H. "Du" Burns Arena in the Baltimore City neighborhood of Canton.

== History ==
The franchise was announced as an expansion member of the North American Lacrosse League on August 26, 2012. This made the thunder the first professional indoor lacrosse team to call Baltimore home since the Baltimore Thunder left in 1999 to become the Pittsburgh CrosseFire, and the first professional lacrosse team of any kind to call the Baltimore region home since the Baltimore Bayhawks moved to Washington, DC in 2006.

Originally scheduled to start their first season against the expansion Rhode Island Kingfish on January 5, 2013, the first game for the Bombers was January 12, 2013 against the Boston Rockhoppers. The Bombers won this game in 17–16 in overtime.

On March 8, 2013, it was officially reported the Baltimore Bombers had folded. General manager and head coach, Hunter Francis noted that "...the economics didn’t work." This news initially broke on Laxdirt.com and later on their Facebook page. Just two days before, the Bombers posted about a giveaway at the game scheduled for March 10.

== Roster ==
2013 Baltimore Bombers
Number	Player's Name	Position	College	Height	Weight
1	Damien Davis	D	Princeton
2	Dan Cocchi	T	Towson
3	Matt Alrich	F	Delaware	6 ft 3 in
6	Ben Rubeor	A	Virginia	5 ft 11 in
8	Josh Rachman	D	Florida State
12	Andrew Wasik	F	Pace
14	Peter Cannon	T	Georgetown
15	Jack Ringo	D	VA Wesleyan
19	Devan Spilker	F	Limestone
20	David Tamberino	F	Maryland
21	Jordan Kenny	F	VA Wesleyan
23	Dan Deckelbaum	T	Delaware
27	Dan Marohl	F	UMBC	6 ft 1 in
29	Ginny Capicchioni	G	Sacred Heart	5 ft 8 in	190 lb
33	David Shortt	D	Loyola
34	Shaun Nadelen	D	Johns Hopkins
41	Andrew Combs	F	Maryland	5 ft 10 in
44	Colton Vosburgh	T	Penn. State
49	Matt Hickman	F	Sailsbury
56	John Orsen	D	Hofstra	6 ft 3 in	203 lb
66	Mike Simons	D	Stevenson
99	Adam Miller	G	SCAD

== 2013 season ==
2013 Baltimore Bombers Season
Date & Time	Away team	Score	Home team	Score	Game Notes
January 12 @ 7:00 PM	Baltimore	17	Boston Rockhoppers	16	Overtime
January 20 @ 3:00 PM	Rhode Island Kingfish	8	Baltimore	12
January 27 @ 3:00 PM	Boston Rockhoppers	20	Baltimore	9
February 1 @ 7:00 PM	Baltimore	17	Kentucky Stickhorses	14
February 3 @ 1:00 PM	Baltimore	10	Kentucky Stickhorses	11	Overtime
February 9 @ 8:00 PM	Rhode Island Kingfish	N/A	Baltimore	N/A	CANCELED
February 17 @ 3:00 PM	Boston Rockhoppers	18	Baltimore	9
February 24 @ 3:00 PM	Kentucky Stickhorses	10	Baltimore	12
March 10 @ 3:00 PM	Kentucky Stickhorses	N/A	Baltimore	N/A	CANCELED
March 16 @ 7:00 PM	Baltimore	N/A	Boston Rockhoppers	N/A	CANCELED

== Season-by-Season ==
Year	Reg. season	Playoffs	Attendance average
2013	4-3✝	N/A	Not Reported

✝ Folded mid-season
