= VyStar Veterans Memorial Arena =

Arena in Jacksonville, Florida, United States

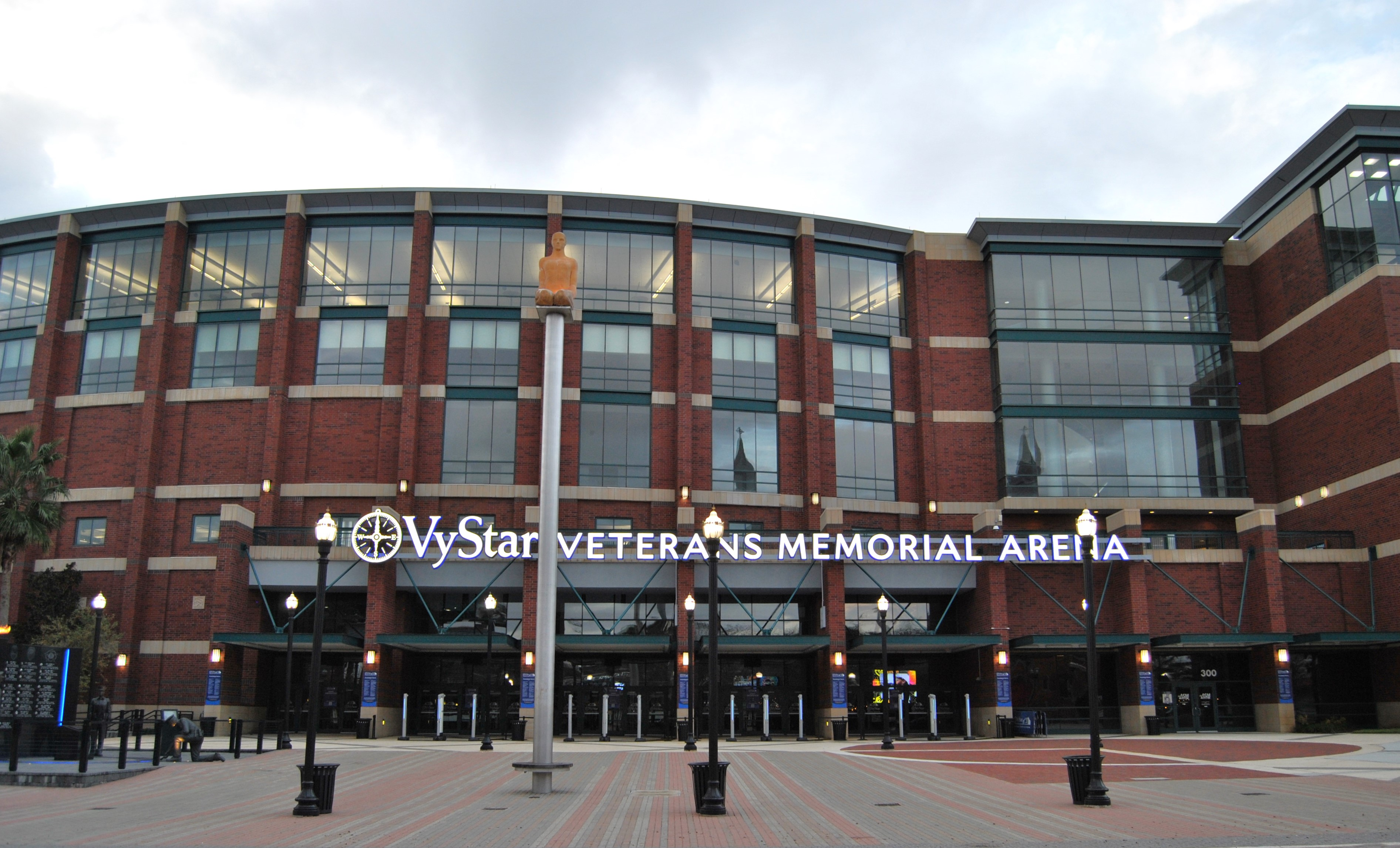
- Entrance to the arena
- Former names: Jacksonville Veterans Memorial Arena (2003–19)
- Address: 300 A Philip Randolph Boulevard
- Location: Jacksonville, Florida, U.S.
- Coordinates: 30°19′32.77″N 81°38′42.25″W
- Owner: City of Jacksonville
- Operator: ASM Gobal
- Capacity: Concerts: 15,000; Basketball: 14,091; Ice Hockey: 13,141; Arena Football: 13,011
- Public transit: Jacksonville Skyway at James Weldon Johnson Park

Construction
- Groundbreaking: November 27, 2001
- Opened: November 28, 2003
- Cost: $130 million ($236 million in 2025 dollars)
- Architect: HOK Sport
- Project managers: Gilbane; Renaissance; Scheer
- Structural engineers: Bliss & Nyitray, Inc.
- Services engineers: Limbach Engineering; Smith Seckman Reid, Inc.; Bessent, Hammack & Ruckman
- General contractors: Turner; Perry-McCall; Northside

Tenants
- Jacksonville Dolphins (NCAA) (2003–2015); Jacksonville Barracudas (WHA2/SPHL) (2003–2007); Jacksonville Giants (ABA) (2010–2022); Jacksonville Sharks (AFL/NAL/IFL) (2010–present); Jacksonville Bullies (PLL) (2012); Jacksonville Breeze (LFL) (2013–2014); Jacksonville Icemen (ECHL) (2017–present); Jacksonville Waves (UpShot League) (2026)

Website
- Venue Website

VyStar Veterans Memorial Arena (originally Jacksonville Veterans Memorial Arena) is a multi-purpose arena located in Jacksonville, Florida. It currently serves as the home arena of the Jacksonville Icemen of the ECHL and the Jacksonville Sharks of the Indoor Football League.

== About ==
The arena was built in 2003 as part of the Better Jacksonville Plan to replace the Jacksonville Coliseum.

On March 12, 2019, a 19–0 vote led to VyStar Credit Union becoming a sponsor for the arena. The 15-year agreement includes an annual contribution to a trust fund to support programs for veterans in the city. It is corporately sponsored despite a city ordinance that on its face prohibits the arena from having such a name. The ordinance does not cover any other venues, which allows for two other venues in Duval County to have corporate sponsors, most notably EverBank Stadium.

=== Naming history ===
- Jacksonville Veterans Memorial Arena (November 28, 2003 – March 13, 2019)
- VyStar Veterans Memorial Arena (March 14, 2019 – present)

== Events and history ==
The arena was designed, using state-of-the-art techniques, to have the acoustical characteristics necessary for concerts. The first artist to hold a concert in the Arena was Elton John in November 2003. Since that time, dozens of groups, including country, rap, rock, and others, have performed at the arena.

=== Ice hockey ===
The arena was home to the Jacksonville Barracudas ice hockey team from 2003 to 2007 until they relocated to a smaller hockey arena in the area.

=== Olympics ===
Sporting events hosted include the 2004 USA Men's Olympic basketball team in their only game played in the United States, as well as some early round games of the NCAA Division I men's basketball tournament in 2006, 2010, 2015, and 2019.

=== UFC ===
The arena held UFC 249: Ferguson vs. Gaethje, UFC Fight Night: Smith vs. Teixeira, and UFC on ESPN: Overeem vs. Harris, and three consecutive Ultimate Fighting Championship events in May 2020, the first major sporting events to be held in the country after restrictions to slow the COVID-19 pandemic went into effect in March. In April 2021 it hosted UFC 261: Usman vs. Masvidal 2, in front of the largest crowd for an indoor sport in more than a year after Florida lifted their restrictions. In April 2022, it hosted UFC 273: Volkanovski vs. The Korean Zombie. The UFC returned to the arena in June 2023 for UFC on ABC: Emmett vs. Topuria.

=== Professional wrestling ===
On October 17, 2006, an episode of ECW on Sci-Fi was held in the arena. In 2007, the arena held the WWE pay-per-view event One Night Stand in 2007. As of 2025, it is the only WWE pay-per-view the arena hosted. However, the arena still hosts various Raw and SmackDown shows.

=== AFL ===
The arena found huge success when the arena became the home of the Jacksonville Sharks in 2010 when they were introduced as an expansion team of the Arena Football League. The team was founded by former Orlando Predators executive Jeff Bouchy, who is also the brother of former Orlando Predators owner Brett Bouchy. The Sharks generally have maintained the highest attendance among the arena's regular tenants.

=== ABA ===
The arena hosted the 2011 ABA All-Star Game, which took place on February 26, 2011.

=== PLL ===
In 2012, the arena was home to the Jacksonville Bullies of the Professional Lacrosse League.

=== LFL ===
In 2013 and 2014, it was home to the Jacksonville Breeze of the Legends Football League.

=== Concerts ===
In 2016, Rihanna opened her Anti World Tour at the arena, which attracted an audience of 11,000 people.

On December 1, 2019 Ariana Grande held a concert at the arena, which was part of her Sweetener World Tour. Monster Jam came to the arena in 2018, and again the following year.

=== Other events ===
Under cancelled plans for 2020 Republican National Convention to be held in Jacksonville arena was scheduled to host days 2-4 of the 2020 Republican National Convention from August 25 to August 27, originally to be held in Charlotte, North Carolina. However, these plans were ultimately cancelled to the COVID-19 pandemic.

The arena was the host for the Davis Cup first round tie between the US and Brazil on the weekend of February 1–3, 2013. It has hosted PBR Built Ford Tough Series events in the past.

Preceded by Ford Center (Evansville)	Home of the Jacksonville Icemen; 2017 – present	Succeeded by current
