= Pennsylvania Haymakers =

- Founded: 2011
- Based in: Hershey, Pennsylvania
- Arena: Giant Center
- Colors: Blue, orange, white
- Head coach: Hunter Francis
- Local media: The Patriot-News; WQIC; WHTM-TV (ABC27); WHP-TV (CBS21); WGAL-TV (NBC8); WPMT-TV (FOX43)
- Website: hersheyhaymakers.com

The Pennsylvania Haymakers were an American professional indoor lacrosse team based in Pennsylvania. They are a charter member of the Professional Lacrosse League. They were previously known as the Hershey Haymakers and intended to play in Hershey, Pennsylvania. However, they did not secure a lease to the Giant Center.

== History ==
The Hershey Haymakers were announced on September 28, 2011 with an official response by then-Pennsylvania governor Tom Corbett:

"As a former player at Lebanon Valley College, I'm thrilled to welcome professional lacrosse to the mid-state region. I hope the presence of this new team will inspire more of Pennsylvania's young people to take up my favorite sport. I look forward to cheering on the Hershey franchise in the inaugural season of the NALL and encouraging central Pennsylvania's great sports fans to show this team the same high level of support as our other professional sports teams have enjoyed for years."

On January 6, 2012 the NALL announced the suspension of the Hershey Haymakers due to their inability to secure a deal with their intended arena, the Giant Center. They never played a game in the new league. They are currently affiliated with the Professional Lacrosse League and are reportedly seeking a stadium lease in another area.
