= Jacksonville Bullies =

American indoor lacrosse team

- Founded: 2012
- League: Professional Lacrosse League
- Based in: Jacksonville, Florida
- Arena: VyStar Veterans Memorial Arena
- Colors: Blue, gold, silver, white
- Owner: Brett Vickers and Chris Milo
- Head coach: Brian Duncan
- General manager: Chris Milo
- Website: www.jaxbullies.com

The Jacksonville Bullies were a professional indoor lacrosse team based in Jacksonville, Florida, U.S. Following a dispute with their original league, they played part of the 2012 season in the Professional Lacrosse League before canceling the remainder of their games. They played their home games at the Jacksonville Veterans Memorial Arena.

== History ==
The franchise, co-owned by Brett Vickers and Chris Milo, was announced as the third founding member of the North American Lacrosse League on August 4, 2011. One factor in the selection of Jacksonville was the success of the Moe's Southwestern Grille Sunshine Classic tournament between NCAA Division I lacrosse teams, including the local Jacksonville University Dolphins, in February 2011. The name and logo were announced on August 31; the name was chosen to recall the bulldog while not being confused with the University of Georgia Bulldogs. The logo depicts a bulldog with a lacrosse stick in its mouth and a small anchor hanging from its collar in reference to Jacksonville's strong connections with the U.S. Navy. Jacksonville University defensive coordinator Brian Duncan was named head coach; co-owner Chris Milo also served as general manager.

On December 31, 2011, Jacksonville and three of the four other teams announced the NALL had fired its acting commissioner and would move to a fall schedule. This measure led to a rift in the organization that went to litigation. As a result, the faction that stuck to the winter schedule retained the North American Lacrosse League name, while the fall faction formed the Professional Lacrosse League. The Bullies played part of the 2012 season before canceling the remainder of their games in October.
