= Professional Lacrosse League =

Former lacrosse developmental league in the United States

- Sport: Indoor lacrosse
- Founded: 2012
- First season: 2012
- Folded: 2013
- No. of teams: 2
- Country: United States
- Website: ProLacrosseLeague.com

The Professional Lacrosse League (PLL) was a men's professional indoor lacrosse league in the United States. It was announced in 2012 with its inaugural season scheduled to begin in September 2012. The league originated in a split with the North American Lacrosse League (NALL). The league ended after a year, in 2013.

== History ==
The Professional Lacrosse League developed out of a rift in the North American Lacrosse League, which was originally scheduled to start play with five teams in January 2012. Weeks before the NALL season was to start, four of the teams – the Charlotte Copperheads, the Hershey Haymakers, the Jacksonville Bullies, and the Wilkes-Barre/Scranton Shamrocks – announced that the NALL had relieved acting Commissioner Anthony Caruso of duty and would be switching from a winter to a fall schedule. In turn, Caruso responded that his removal was illegitimate and that he remained in charge of the NALL, which would keep to the winter schedule. The dispute went to litigation, with the result that winter faction kept the NALL name and branding, while the fall faction formed the PLL.

Brett Vickers was announced as PLL League President. The league was supposed to start play with four teams in September 2012, however, it was announced that the Haymakers and Shamrocks franchises had not secured arena leases and were currently searching for new locations.

On July 11, 2012, Commissioner Brett Vickers announced on Twitter "@PLLcommissioner I love throwing people off by setting up websites." & "Heading South..........had two great meetings in the two new PLL cities Wednesday and yesterday. Excited about September!". This added to speculation that New Jersey might not be the league's newest member. On August 28, Brett Vickers resigned from the PLL.

On September 6, 2012, New Jersey Rascals CEO announced "It is with a heavy heart that we announce the New Jersey Rascals will not be playing this season. We believe it is in the best interest of our fans, the Sun National Bank Center, our corporate partners and sponsors to take another year to explore the many ways that we can build on the great momentum we are seeing in the Mercer County area." With the loss of the Rascals, the 2012 PLL season was in serious jeopardy. The Rascals tried to become a charter member of the failed United States Lacrosse League.

== Teams ==
Team	City	Arena (Capacity)
Charlotte Copperheads	Charlotte, North Carolina	Bojangles' Coliseum (9,605)
Reading Rockets	Reading, Pennsylvania	Sovereign Center (7,083)

== Former teams ==
Team	City	Arena (Capacity)
Jacksonville Bullies	Jacksonville, Florida	Jacksonville Veterans Memorial Arena (13,141)
New Jersey Rascals	Trenton, New Jersey	Sun National Bank Center (7,604)

== See also ==
- List of professional sports teams in the United States and Canada
