= Fairfield Stags =

Athletic teams of Fairfield University

- University: Fairfield University
- Nickname: Stags
- NCAA: Division I
- Conference: MAAC (primary); CAA (men's lacrosse, field hockey; primary beginning 2027)
- Athletic director: Paul Schlickmann
- Location: Fairfield, Connecticut
- Varsity teams: 20
- Basketball arena: Leo D. Mahoney Arena
- Baseball stadium: Alumni Baseball Diamond
- Soccer stadium: Lessing Field
- Lacrosse stadium: Rafferty Stadium
- Colors: Red
- Mascot: Lucas the Stag
- Fight song: Fight for Fairfield U!
- Website: fairfieldstags.com
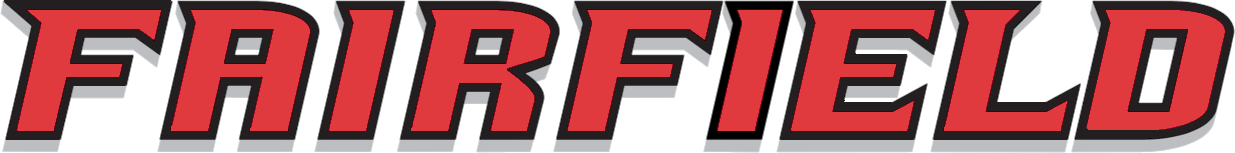

The Fairfield Stags are the athletic programs representing Fairfield University in Fairfield, Connecticut. Most of the programs are members of the Metro Atlantic Athletic Conference (MAAC) and classified as Division I (non-football) in the National Collegiate Athletic Association (NCAA).

The men's and women's golf programs are both ranked among the best in the nation for academics, according to Golf Digest.

== Traditions ==
=== History of the Stag ===
With the dawn of the first athletic team (cross country) in the fall of 1947, it became apparent that a nickname would be needed. For the 1947–48 season, Fairfield University adopted the "Men In Red" as its nickname.

The following year, the university introduced men's basketball as its next team and its first varsity sport. With the start of varsity sports, the school put it to the students for input in naming of a school mascot. Two recommendations were made to the board of trustees for an official decision and vote. As the late Fr. Charles F. Duffy S.J. recounted: "As a member of the Board of Trustees, I remember voting at a board meeting late in 1948 on the naming for our athletic teams. We voted for Stags over Chanticleers!"

What made the decision for the Board a bit easier and logical was that the school was part of the Diocese of Hartford and the word Hartford means stags (hart) and stream (ford). According to Webster's New World Dictionary the word "hart" means "A male of the European red deer; stag." As for the world "ford" Webster describes it as "A shallow place in a stream, river, etc."

As a result, Fairfield University's seal itself was designed featuring a deer leaping over a tumbling brook to represent both the school's connection with the Dioceses as well with its close ties with nature.

Fairfield is situated on a rolling, wooded 200-acre (0.81 km^{2}) campus overlooking Long Island Sound. The name fits as a nickname because the Stag is a good jumper and it spirited and agile, as Fairfield would like all of its student-athletes to be.

== Sports sponsored ==
Men's sports	Women's sports
Baseball	Basketball
Basketball	Cross country
Cross country	Field hockey
Lacrosse	Golf
Rowing	Lacrosse
Soccer	Rowing
Swimming and diving	Soccer
Tennis	Softball
	Swimming and diving
	Tennis
	Volleyball

=== Baseball ===
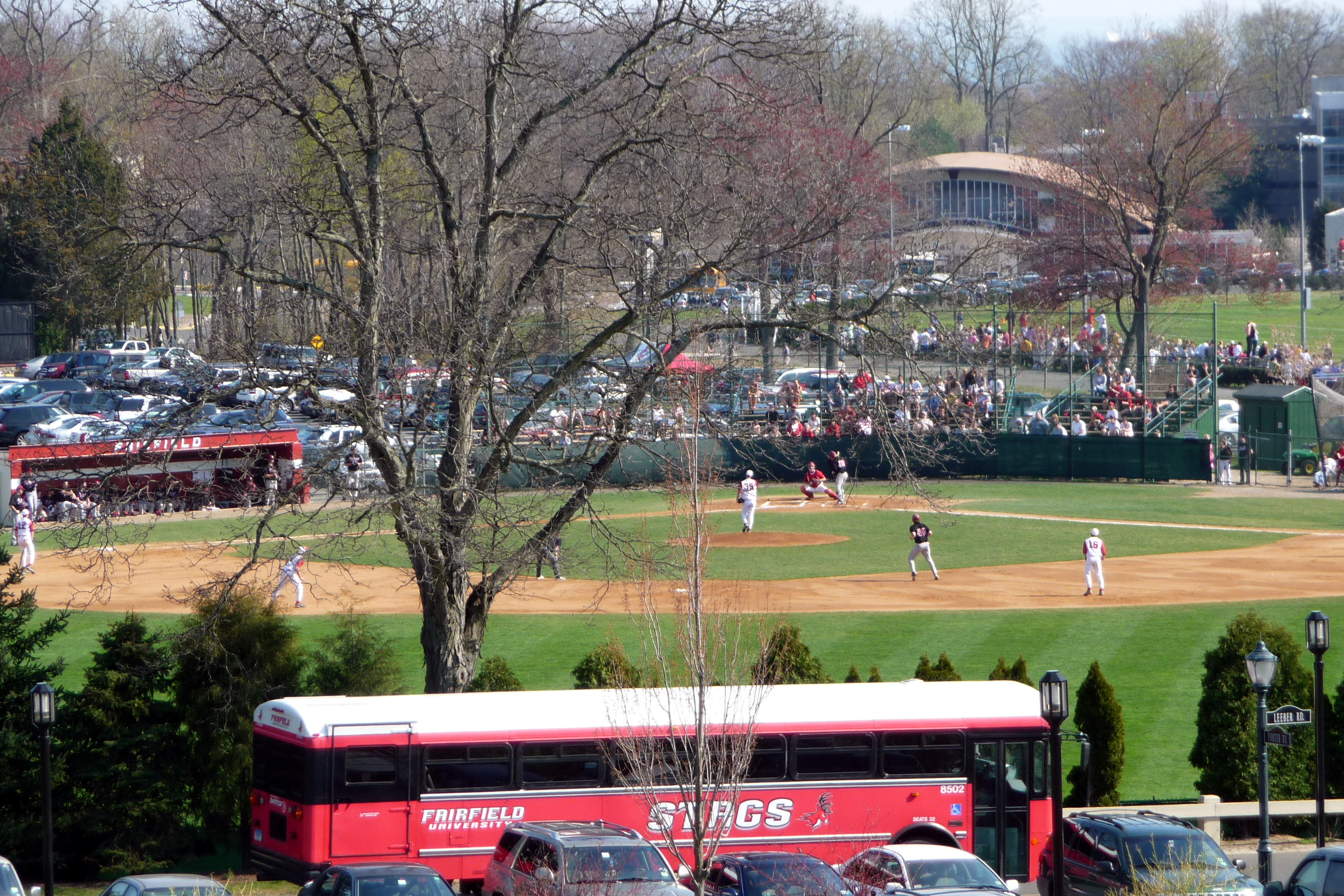
Alumni Baseball Diamond

The baseball team competes in the Metro Atlantic Athletic Conference of NCAA Division I and plays their home games at the Alumni Baseball Diamond on the campus of Fairfield University. Fairfield fielded its first varsity baseball team in 1951, winning 7 of 12 games. The Stags, coached by Don Cook, made the first of three straight trips to the ECAC New England Tournament in 1977, defeating defending champion University of Maine. The team was MAAC South Champions in 1983, 1991, 1993, 1995 and 1997. Individually, Anthony Hajjar was named a 2010 Louisville Slugger Freshman All-American; Peter Allen was named to the 2008 Brooks Wallace Player of the Year Watch List following his program record setting season in 2007 in which he was ranked nationally in doubles, batting average, and slugging percentage; and Mike Pike was named a 1993 Mizuno Freshman All-American.

Keefe Cato, the holder of ten Fairfield pitching records including seven career shutouts and one no-hitter, was the first Fairfield athlete to play in a major professional sport on the major league level after being selected by the Cincinnati Reds in the second round of the 1979 Major League Baseball draft. He was the Reds’ winning pitcher in his second game. And Rob Gariano, who surpassed Cato's 31 year stand as Fairfield's all-time strikeout leader with 293 strikeouts was drafted in the 36th round of the 2010 Major League Baseball draft by the San Diego Padres. The Stags are currently coached by 2012 MAAC Coach of the Year Bill Currier.

=== Men's basketball ===
The men's basketball team competes in the Metro Atlantic Athletic Conference of NCAA Division I. The Stags play their home games in the 3,500-seat Leo D. Mahoney Arena on campus. Opened in November 2022, the arena replaces Alumni Hall, which was the home of the Stags from 1959 to 2022.

Fairfield competed in the National Invitational Tournament in 1973, 1974, 1978, 1996 and 2003, as well as the NCAA Division I men's basketball tournament in 1986, 1987 and 1997. In the 1973 National Invitation Tournament, the Stags advanced to the second round where the team lost by one point to eventual National Champion Virginia Tech. And in the 1997 NCAA Tournament, the Stags nearly achieved a historic upset of top-seeded North Carolina after leading the Tar Heels by seven points at halftime.

The team also won the MAAC Regular Season Title in 1986 and the MAAC Championship Tournament in 1986, 1987 and 1997. Individually, Joe DeSantis earned All-American honors in 1979; Darren Phillip was the nation's top rebounder in 2001 averaging 14 rebounds per game; and Deng Gai was the nation's top shot blocker in 2005 averaging 5.5 blocks per game ranking him 5th all-time in NCAA Division I basketball. The Stags are currently coached by Chris Casey.

The men's basketball team is currently coached by Chris Casey. The Stags have participated in National Invitational Tournament in 1973, 1974, 1978, 1996, 2003 and 2011, and the NCAA Division I men's basketball tournament in 1986, 1987 and 1997.

In the first round of the 1997 NCAA Tournament, the Stags nearly achieved a historic upset over top ranked and Final Four bound North Carolina, leading the Tar Heels by seven points at halftime, before ultimately losing 82–74. UNC's win was Coach Dean Smith's 876th win as a Division I college coach, tying him for first all-time. That record has since been broken.

In 2010, during the first round of the CIT, the team set the national record for the largest comeback in Division I college basketball postseason history by overcoming a 27-point deficit with under 16 minutes to play to defeat George Mason in overtime, 101–96.

Head coach Ed Cooley was named the Ben Jobe National Coach of the Year in 2010. Thirteen Stags have been either drafted or signed to play in the NBA.

=== Women's basketball ===
The women's basketball team competes in the Metro Atlantic Athletic Conference of NCAA Division I. The Stags play their home games in the 3,500 seat Leo D. Mahoney Arena on campus. The women's basketball team has won the MAAC title in 1988, 1991, 1998, 2022, 2023 and regular season titles in 1990, 1991, 2000, 2022, and 2023. In 2023, they went undefeated in conference play, reached the Associated Press Top 25 and went to the NCAA Tournament. They are currently coached by Carly Thibault-DuDonis.

Under former coach Diane Nolan, who reached her milestone 500th win in 2006, the Stags competed in the NCAA Women's Basketball Championship in 1988, 1991, 1998, and 2001. Individually, Katrina Fields in 1985, Dana Pellegrino in 1987 and 1988 and Lisa Mikelic in 1991 earned All-American honors. The Stags are currently coached by Joe Frager, who previously coached the Southern Connecticut State University Owls to the 2007 NCAA Division II Women's Basketball National Title.

=== Cross country ===
The cross country running team is the oldest athletics program at the university, dating back to 1947. The Rev. Victor Leeber, S.J. founded the team and is the namesake of the annual Father Leeber Invitational hosted by the university and held on the campus grounds. Members of the Fairfield University Hall of Fame include: John Barry '62, Joseph von Ehr '74, Joseph Miko '51, Michael Collins '77, and Ian MacNeill '97. The Stags participate in the MAAC conference like the majority of the other Fairfield programs. For three straight years (07–09) the men have been recognized as part of the NCAA Academic Performance Program. The program has seen a resurgence since the hiring of John Sagnelli, formerly a coach at the University of New Haven, in 2007. Last year the men's team placed 5th in the MAAC up two spots from 7th in 2008 and 9th in 2007.

=== Field hockey ===
The field hockey team, as of the 2019 season, have competed in the Northeast Conference (NEC) of NCAA Division I. The NEC effectively took over operation of the MAAC field hockey league after the 2018 season. The Stags play their home games at University Field on the campus of Fairfield University. The team competed in the 1981 NCAA Division III EAIAW Regional Playoffs and the 2001 NCAA Women's Field Hockey Championship. The team also won the Patriot League Regular Season Title in 1998 and the Patriot League Tournament Championship in 2001. Individually, Mary Beth Combs received the Connecticut NCAA Woman of the Year Award in 1993 and ten players have earned NFHCA Mideast Regional All-American honors. The Stags are currently coached by Jackie Kane '87.

=== Football ===
The now defunct football team once competed in the Metro Atlantic Athletic Conference of NCAA Division I-AA between 1996 and 2003. Following the team's inaugural season, the 1997 team recorded the second-best single-season turnaround in Division I-AA history posting a 7–3 mark. The Stags won the Metro Atlantic Athletic Conference title in 1998 posting a 9–2 record and head coach Kevin Kiesel captured the league's Coach of the Year Award. Fairfield also had the top-rated Division I-AA defense for rushing (61.7 y.p.g.) and for total yards (213.8 y.p.g.). The 1999 team also went 9–2 and ranked fifth among the nation's Division I-AA non-scholarship teams. The defense was ranked second for scoring defense (13.4 p.p.g) and for total defense (237.7 y.p.g.). The 2000 team compiled an 8–2 record and ranked seventh in the country.

In total, seven Fairfield players earned All-American honors, and one player received Academic All-American honors. During the 2000 season, senior Steve Dogmanits (Fairfield's all-time leader in interceptions with 21) set a school-standard of 11. This was enough to lead all of Division I-AA, just missing the national record (12) set in 1987 by Dean Cain of Princeton University and "Lois & Clark" fame. Fairfield has the second highest winning percentage (.611) among all major defunct football teams.

The 1979 Fairfield, led by All-America and Hall of Fame quarterback Craig Leach '81, played in the National Collegiate Football Association's National Championship game where the Stags fell 60–40 to the University of Massachusetts Lowell. The 1980 team started the season ranked #1 in the pre-season NCFA Polls.

=== Men's lacrosse ===
The men's lacrosse team competes in the Coastal Athletic Association of NCAA Division I. The Stags have won eight regular season conference titles since 1996 and competed in the NCAA Division I men's lacrosse tournament in 2002 and 2005. The Stags play their home games at the new lacrosse-only Rafferty Stadium and are currently coached by Andrew Copelan.

The men's lacrosse team currently competes in the Colonial Athletic Association (CAA). The team has previously competed in the MAAC, GWLL, and ECAC. Since 1996, the team has won 8 Conference Regular Season Titles and 2 Conference Tournament Titles. The team has been ranked nationally over the years, and earned berths to the 2003 and 2005 NCAA Men's Lacrosse Championship tournaments. 14 players have received All-American honors over the years, and 12 players have gone on to play professionally in Major League Lacrosse (MLL).

The team plays their home games at the lacrosse-only Rafferty Stadium and are currently coached by Andrew Baxter, who succeeded Andrew Copelan in 2019.

On April 21, 2013, men's lacrosse set the school record for the defeat of the highest ranked opponent in any sport, when the Stags upset the Denver Pioneers 9–8, who were then ranked no. 1 in the United States. The previous record was set on March 13, 2010, when the Stags upset the then no. 3 nationally ranked (and eventual 2010 NCAA tournament runner-up) Notre Dame Fighting Irish 10–8 while competing in the inaugural 'Beating Cancer With A Stick Classic' at The Kinkaid School in Houston, Texas.

=== Women's lacrosse ===
The women's lacrosse team competes in the Metro Atlantic Athletic Conference of NCAA Division I. The Stags play their home games at Lessing Field on the campus of Fairfield University. The team competed in the 2009 NCAA Women's Lacrosse Championship challenging the Ivy League Champion Penn Quakers before falling 10–8 in the first round. The Stags won the MAAC Regular Season Title in 1999, 2001, 2002, 2003, 2007, 2008 and 2009 the MAAC Tournament Championship in 2001 and 2009. Individually, Kristen Coleman earned All-America Third Team in 2009; and Lauren Uhr in 2002, Beth Loffredo in 2006, Kristen Coleman in 2008, and Rebecca White in 2009 earned Regional All-American honors.

The team has won 12 MAAC Regular Season Titles in the last decade and earned a berth to the 2009, 2015, 2018, 2021, and 2022 NCAA Women's Lacrosse Championship. The Stags are currently coached by National Lacrosse Hall of Fame Inductee and 2009 MAAC Coach of the Year, Michael J. Waldvogel.

=== Men's soccer ===
The men's soccer team competes in the Metro Atlantic Athletic Conference of NCAA Division I. The Stags play their home games at Lessing Field on the campus of Fairfield University. The team was ranked nationally in 1998 (24th), 2000 (15th), 2001 (12th), 2005 (24th), 2006 (15th) and 2007 (17th) and competed in the NCAA Division I tournament in 1999, 2006, and 2008. The 2006 team advanced to the second round in the NCAA Tournament after defeating in-state rival University of Connecticut, 2–1.

The team also won the MAAC Championship Tournament in 1999, 2006 and 2008. Individually, eleven players have earned Regional All-American honors including Mark Longwell '82 who was the first Stag to go on to play for the United States men's national soccer team and major professional soccer for the NASL Tampa Bay Rowdies. In 2012 Fairfield goalkeeper, Michael O'Keeffe, was called up to play with the New Zealand National Team's Olympic squad. In summer 2021 Matt Turner (soccer) was called up to the US Men's National Team and won the Gold Cup Golden Glove award for best Goalkeeper of the tournament.

The Stags are currently coached by 1998 NSCAA New England Coach of the Year Carl Rees.

=== Women's soccer ===
The women's soccer team competes in the Metro Atlantic Athletic Conference of NCAA Division I. The Stags play their home games at Lessing Field on the campus of Fairfield University. The team has advanced five times to the NCAA Division I Women's Soccer Tournament, most recently in 2005 and 2008. The team has also won the MAAC Championship seven times (1993, 1995, 1997, 1998, 1999, 2005 and 2008). Individually, Abby Allan in 2000, Meghan King in 2004 and Ahna Johnson in 2008 earned All-America honors; Ahna Johnson in 2008 earned Academic All-America honors; Betsy Nyman in 2007 earned Regional Academic All-America honors; and Nicole Cavallaro in 2007 received Freshman All-America honors. In 2010, Brett Maron became the first former Fairfield player to sign a professional contract in the United States with the Atlanta Beat of the Women's Professional Soccer league. The Stags are currently coached by 2008 NSCAA Northeast Region Coach of the Year Jim O'Brien.

The women's soccer team has advanced to the NCAA Women's Soccer Championship five times and has won the MAAC Championship seven times since 1993.

=== Softball ===
The softball team competes in the Metro Atlantic Athletic Conference of NCAA Division I. The Stags play their home games at Alumni Softball Field on the campus of Fairfield University. The team won the MAAC Regular Season Title in 2002, 2003 and 2004. They won the MAAC tournament and advanced to the NCAA tournament in 2015 and 2017. Individually, in 2003 Mellissa Santos became the 16th player in Division I history to reach 1,000 career strikeouts and is currently ranked 23rd all-time on the NCAA Division I Softball career strikeouts list. And Jen Derouin in 1998 and Tara Hansen in 2006 earned Academic All-American honors. The Stags are currently coached by Julie Brzezinski who achieved her 500th career win in 2006.

=== Tennis ===
The women's tennis team competes in the Metro Atlantic Athletic Conference (MAAC) of NCAA Division I. The Stags play their home matches at the Walsh Athletic Center Tennis Courts on the campus of Fairfield University. The Stags have earned three berths to the NCAA Women's Tennis Championship and have won nine MAAC Championships in program history. The Stags faced the University of Washington during the 2004 NCAA Women's Tennis Championship, the University of Southern California during the 2009 NCAA Women's Tennis Championship and eventual National Champion Stanford University during the 2010 NCAA Women's Tennis Championship. The Stags are currently coached by 2008 MAAC Coach of the Year Ed Paige.

=== Volleyball ===
The women's volleyball team competes in the Metro Atlantic Athletic Conference of NCAA Division I. The Stags play their home matches at Alumni Hall on the campus of Fairfield University. The team was nationally ranked in 1998 (24th) and 1999 (32nd) and competed in five straight NCAA Division I women's volleyball tournaments between 1997 and 2001. The team has also won the MAAC Regular Season Title nine times (1996–2000 and 2004–2007) and the MAAC Championship Tournament five times (1997–2001). Individually, Renee O’Neill earned Academic All-American honors in 1989 and Joanne Saunders earned Regional All-American honors in 2000. The Stags are currently coached by Todd Kress.

== Club sports ==
Sport clubs offer baseball, equestrian, men's and women's ice hockey, martial arts, men's and women's rugby, sailing, men's and women's skiing and snowboarding, men's and women's soccer, men's and women's track and men's and women's volleyball.

=== Equestrian ===
The equestrian club was regional champions in 1996, 1997, 1999, 2000, 2002, & 2003 and in 2007 seven Fairfield riders were invited to the elite Tournament of Champions, a horse show for the nation's top collegiate equestrian teams.

=== Ice hockey ===
Ice hockey began as a club sport with a schedule of scrimmages in 1966–67. In its first full schedule of games in 1968–69, the team finished with an 18–8–0 record and joined the Metropolitan Intercollegiate Hockey League (MIHL). The team posted a 27–0 regular season record during the 1973–74 season and captured the MIHL championship.

The club (formerly an NCAA level Division I program of the now-defunct MAAC) competed in the 2007 MCHC Championship game and the 2008, 2015, 2016, 2017, 2018 ACHA National Tournaments.

The hockey program was elevated to varsity status for the 1974–75 season under Dr. John McCarthy and posted an 18–8–1 mark that year. The Stags were a founding member of the MAAC Hockey League in 1998, and the team's best record in the MAAC came in 2000–2001 with a 10–14–2 mark. They posted a 275–414–28 record in varsity play, heading into the 2002–03 season. The team was disbanded by the university due to financial reasons after the 2002–03 season.

Hockey as a club sport returned to the university during the 2003–04 season. The 2004–2005 squad finished the regular season with a 12–2–1–1 regular season record and fell just a game short of the Metropolitan Collegiate Hockey Conference (MCHC) championship. The 2003–2004 squad finished their season in second place and made it all the way to the league championship. The 2005–2006 Stags posted a 20–4–0–0 record and reached the league semifinals for the third straight season. The 2007–2008 club finished with an overall record of 20–9, qualifying for a trip to Rochester, Minnesota to compete in the American Collegiate Hockey Association (ACHA) National Championships. The Stags finished their championship run with a 6–3 victory over Old Dominion, compiling a 1–3 record at the national event. And the 2009–2010 season began with the team competing in the newly formed Empire Collegiate Hockey Conference. The 2012–2013 season brought many ups and downs for the stags. Returning to regional play for the first time in a few years, the stags fell short in their opening bid vs Penn State Alvernia finishing 10th overall in the region. Led by injury prone and scoring machine Kevin Gavin and anchored by defensemen Brendan O'Malley the Stags were able to finish 2nd overall in conference play heading into the 2013–2014 season with high hopes.

The home ice of Fairfield hockey is the Wonderland on Ice in Bridgeport, Connecticut. The Stags currently are coached by head coach Marshall Richards and assistant coach Corey McGee.

=== Rugby ===
The rugby club or is a men's college rugby club which competes in the Men's Collegiate Division II League of the Metropolitan New York Rugby Union. The nickname for the FURFC is the Red Ruggers. The Red Ruggers, established in 1963, is the longest continuously running sport club at Fairfield University. Brad Troup '03 and Will Brazier '05 were USA Rugby Collegiate All-Americans, Honorable Mention. And two former Red Ruggers represented the United States in international competition, Paul Sheehy with the USA Eagles at the 1991 Rugby World Cup and Will Brazier with the USA Tomahawks and USA Falcons.

The Red Ruggers won the 2008 MET NY Rugby Football Union Division II Title and have produced two USA Rugby Collegiate All-Americans. Former Red Ruggers Paul Sheehy '81 competed for the USA Eagles at the 1991 Rugby World Cup and Will Brazier '05 competed for the United States national rugby league team at the 2004 Liberty Bell Cup.

=== Sailing ===
Fairfield University's sailing team completes in the New England Intercollegiate Sailing Conference. The Stags, in partnership with Sacred Heart University, maintain a fleet of fourteen Collegiate Flying Juniors at Captain's Cove Seaport in Black Rock Harbor and race against Division I, varsity teams throughout the New England and Mid-Atlantic region.

=== Ski-Snowboard ===
The Fairfield Stags co-ed ski-snowboard team competes in the Atlantic Highlands Conference under the USCSA. The Stags race throughout the Mid-Atlantic Region and have qualified for the National Championship on numerous occasions.

=== Volleyball ===
The men's volleyball club won the 2006 and 2007 New England Collegiate Volleyball League Division II Championship and competed in the 2001, 2002, 2005, 2006 and 2008 National Intramural-Recreational Sports Association (NIRSA) Volleyball Championships.

== Spirit Team ==
The Spirit Team consists of the cheerleading squad, dance team, and mascot. These groups perform at all men's and women's home basketball games, as well as some other athletic contests and University events.

=== Stags in the Stands ===
Stags in the Stands, founded by Marco Ambrosio '07 in 2005, was a new organization that looked to bring back the intense Stag spirit of the Red Sea, the athletic fan base formed in the 1970s, when students clad in red poured into Alumni Hall and created one of the region's best home court advantages. Later run by Andrew McMahon and Frank Aquino, the Stags in the Stands student group elevated the fan base as the Stags drew 4 of their top 10 largest crowds in 2010–2011. Unfortunately student support at the Total Mortgage Arena has dropped dramatically in recent years, and the average official attendance has fallen to a record-low 1862 in 2013–14.

== Notable All-Americans ==
=== Basketball ===
- Joe DeSantis '79 – All-American Honorable Mention

=== Lacrosse ===
- Spencer Steele '00 – Pre-season All-American Honorable Mention
- C.J. Kemp '03 – Two-Time All-American Honorable Mention
- Peter Vlahakis '03 – Pre-season All-American Honorable Mention
- Greg Downing '07 – Three Time All-American Honorable Mention

=== Soccer ===
- Justin Thompson '02 – NSCAA/adidas Regional All-America
- Bryan Harkin '02 – NSCAA/adidas Regional All-America
- Tomislav Skara '08 – NSCAA/adidas Regional All-America
- Brett Maron '08 – NSCAA/adidas Regional All-America

=== Rugby ===
- Brad Troup '03 – (USA Rugby Collegiate All-American, HM, 2003)
- Will Brazier '05 – (USA Rugby Collegiate All-American, HM, 2005)

== Alumni Athletics Hall of Fame ==
For a list of inductees (by year), see footnote The Alumni Association Athletic Hall of Fame was established in 1982 to honor those alumni who achieved excellence and distinguished themselves in Fairfield's athletic programs. Each year, inductees are selected through a nomination process by the Athletic Hall of Fame Committee and honored at a Fall induction ceremony.

== Facilities ==
Principal athletic facilities include:

Venue	Sport	Opened	Capac.
Alumni Baseball Diamond	Baseball	1951	1,000
Lessing Field	Soccer	2003	600
Leo D. Mahoney Arena	Basketball	2022	3,500
Rafferty Stadium	Lacrosse	2015	3,500
Alumni Softball Field	Softball	1999	n/a

Gallery

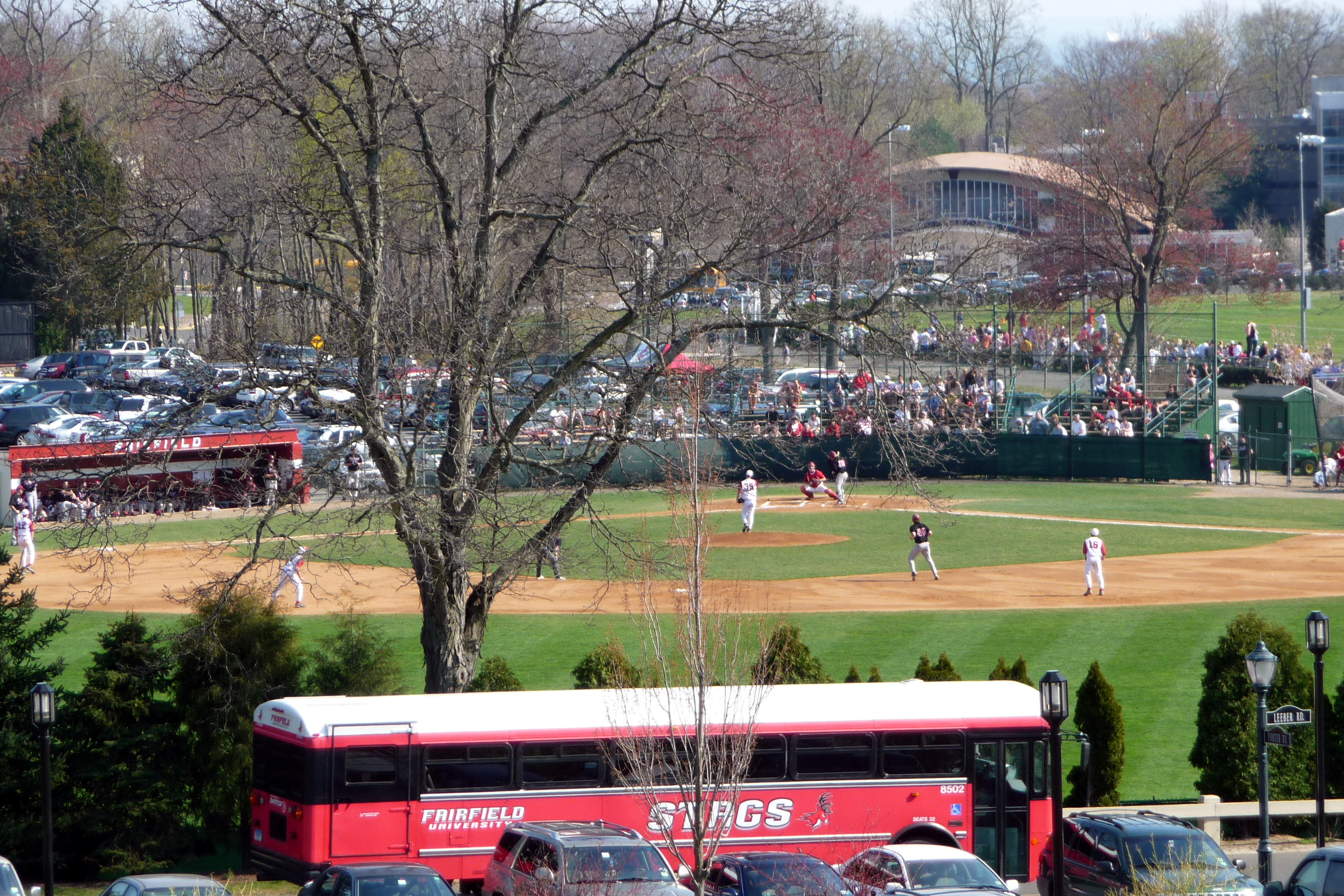
Alumni Baseball Diamond

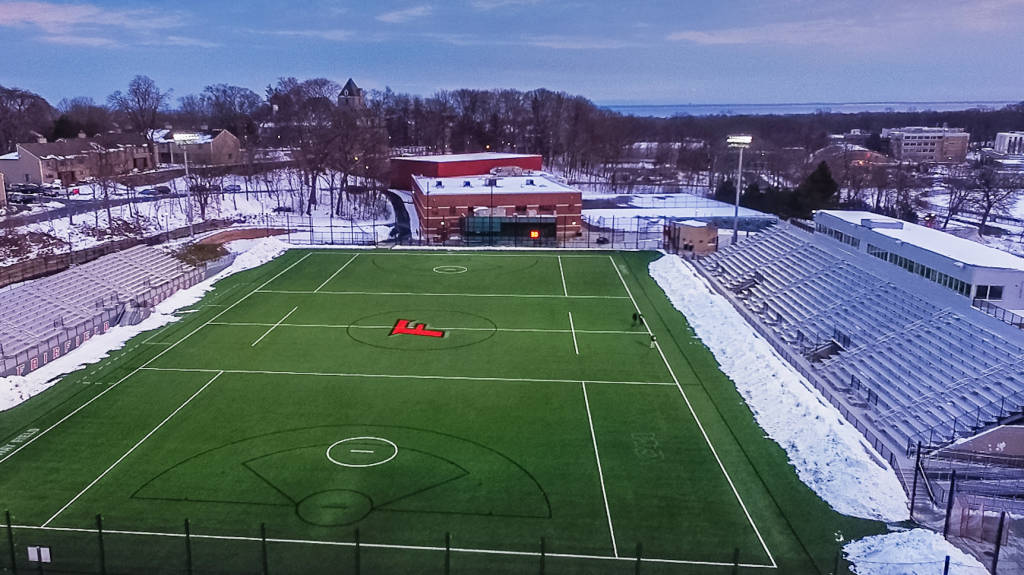
Rafferty Stadium

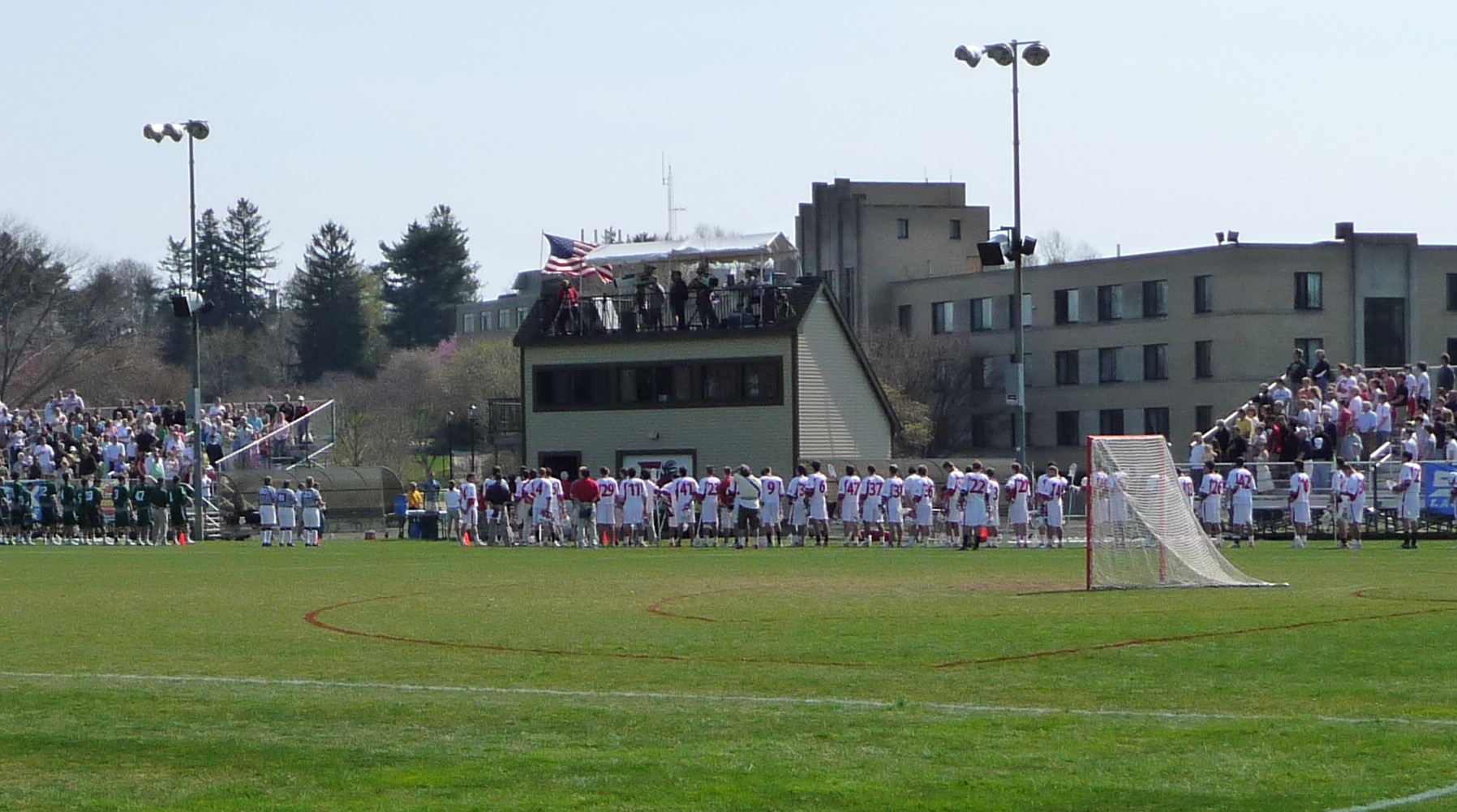
Lessing Field

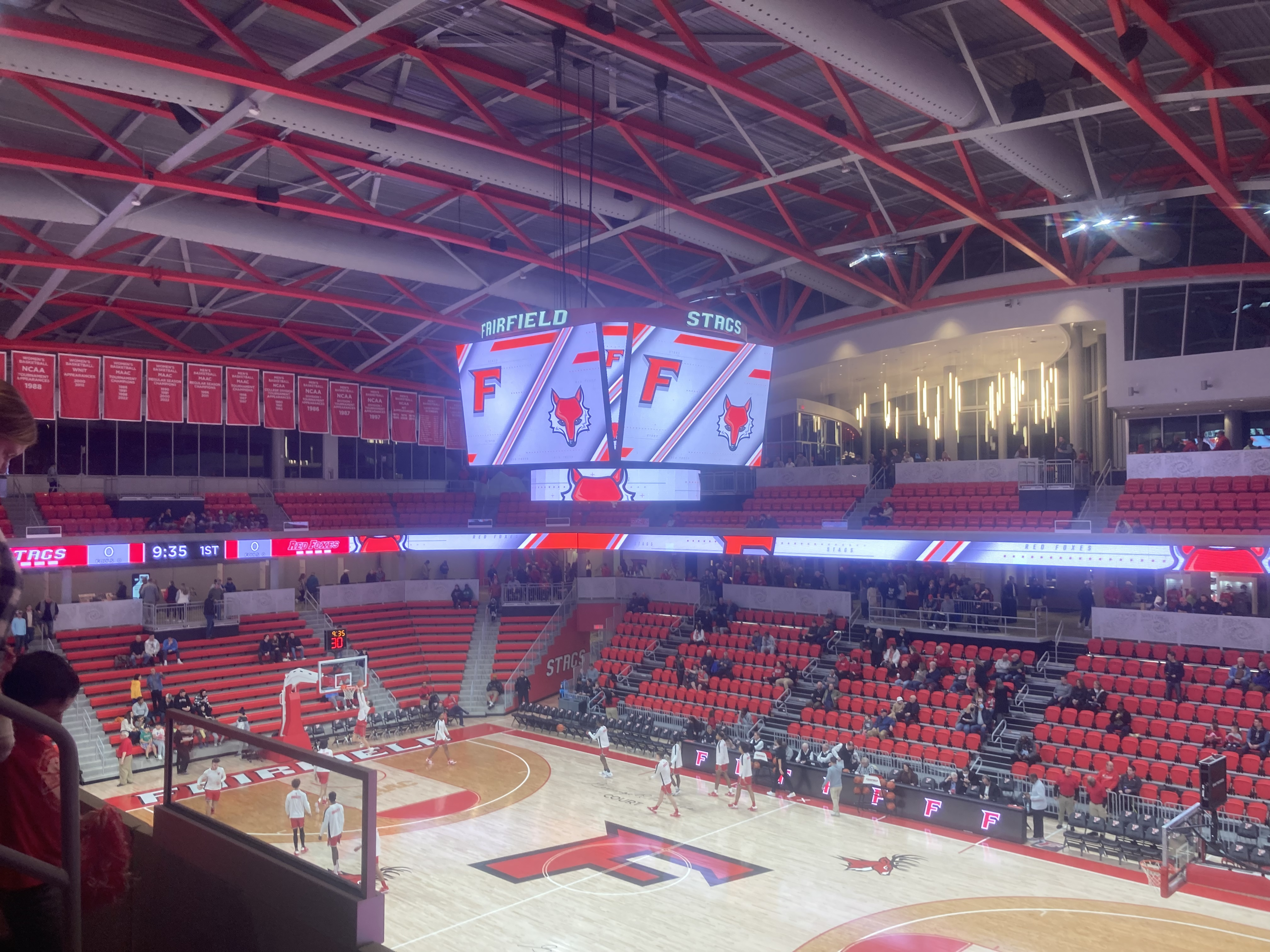
Leo D. Mahoney Arena

The Thomas J. Walsh Athletic Center is 51,000-square-foot (4,700 m^{2}) structure catering to the academic and athletic needs of Fairfield student-athletes with a high-tech academic study center, practice gymnasium, state-of-the-art locker rooms for all athletic teams and a 4,700-square-foot (440 m^{2}) weight training center.

== Athletic directors ==
Name	Years served
George Bisacca	1964–1971
Don Cook	1972–1985
Chappy Memminger	1986–1994
Gene Doris	1995–2017
Paul Schlickmann	2017–Present
