= Lessing Field =

Sporting stadium in Connecticut, United States

Coordinates: 41.161776°N 73.258221°W

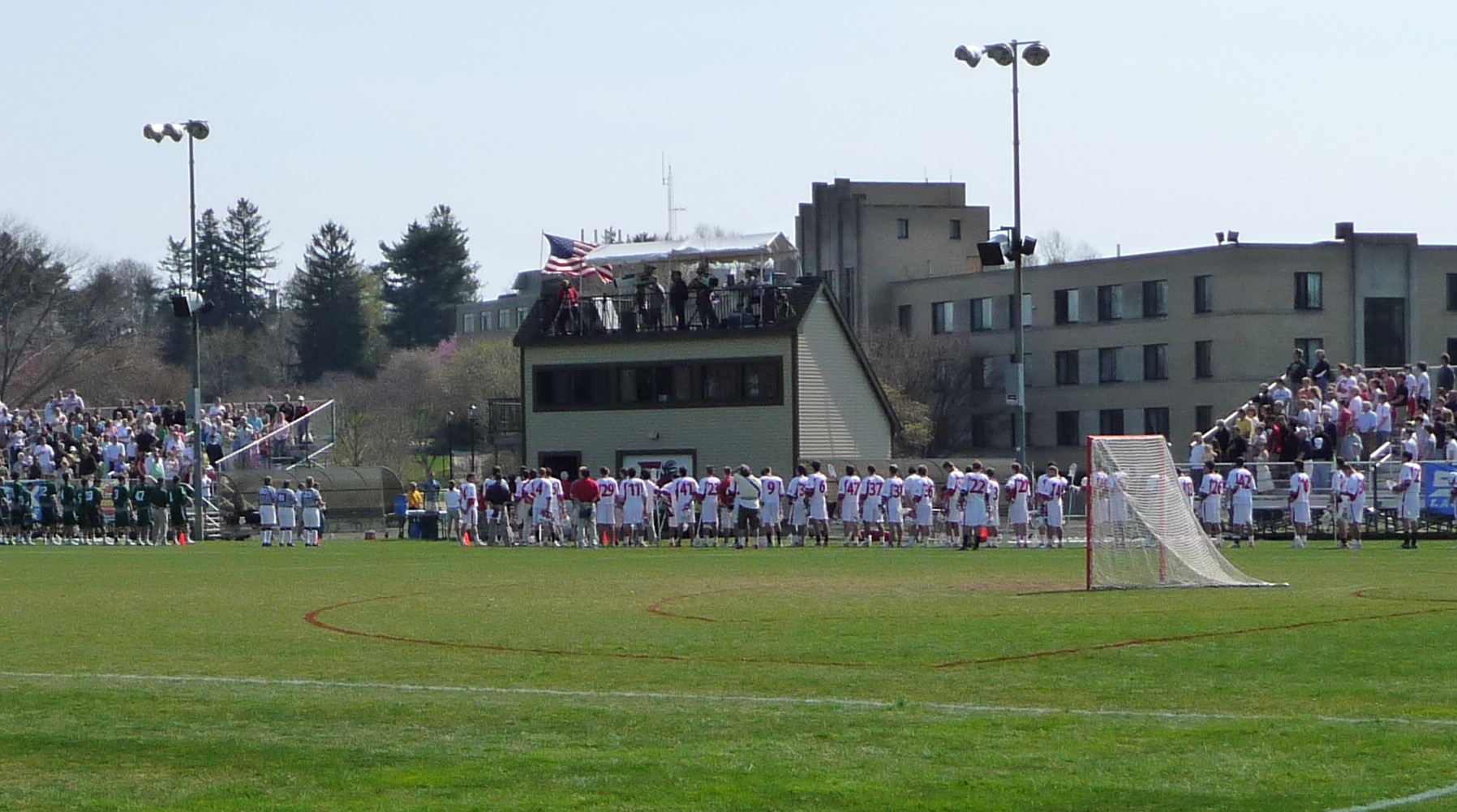
- The stadium during a lacrosse match, 2008
- Interactive map of Lessing Field
- Former names: Varsity Field
- Address: Fairfield, CT; United States
- Owner: Fairfield University
- Operator: Fairfield Athletics
- Capacity: 600
- Type: Stadium
- Current use: Soccer

Construction
- Groundbreaking: 2002
- Opened: 2003; 23 years ago

Tenants
- Fairfield Stags (NCAA) teams: men's and women's soccer (2003–present); men's and women's lacrosse (2003–2014); Fairfield Prep Jesuits (2003–present)

Website
- fairfieldstags.com/lessing-field

Lessing Field is a soccer-specific stadium on the campus of Fairfield University in Fairfield, Connecticut. It is home to the Fairfield Stags men's and women's soccer teams. Previously named "Varsity Field" it was renovated in 2002 including the installation of high-durability sod, a new irrigation and drainage systems, new lights for night games and new stands with capacity for 600 fans.

Lessing Field is named in honor of Stephen Lessing '76, a former member of the Fairfield Stags men's tennis team and current member of the Fairfield University Board of Trustees whose generosity allowed for the stadium renovations.

The stadium used to serve as Fairfield men's and women's lacrosse teams until they moved to Rafferty Stadium, opened in 2015.

== MAAC Championships ==
Lessing Field has played host to numerous conference championships, including the 2004 MAAC Women's Soccer Championship, 2005 MAAC Women's Lacrosse Championship, 2006 MAAC Men's Soccer Championship, and both the 2007 MAAC Men's and Women's Soccer Championships. The finals for all the 2006 and 2007 Championship events were aired live on ESPNU.

== Memorable moments ==
- The Goal: On April 16, 2005, playing before 1,376 fans at Lessing Field, the No. 20 Fairfield Stags men's lacrosse team was knotted at 11 goals apiece with eight seconds left in a game against the No. 11 Notre Dame Fighting Irish. The Stags' three-time All-American midfielder Greg Downing '07 took possession of the ball out of a timeout, beat his defender and rocketed a shot past the Notre Dame goalie to give the Stags the upset win. "The Goal", which was Downing's fifth of the day, came with three seconds left on the clock and gave the Stags a program record-tying seventh straight win. Four weeks later before 2,486 fans at Alumni Field, the No. 17 Stags led by a hat-trick from Tom Werney '05 upset the No. 12 Denver Pioneers to clinch their second GWLL Championship and berth in the 2005 NCAA Division I Men's Lacrosse Tournament.
- On November 5, 2006, in front of a national audience on ESPNU the Fairfield Stags men's soccer team won the 2006 MAAC Soccer Championship and earned a berth to the 2006 NCAA Men's Soccer Championship with a 1–0 victory over St. Peter's College. The lone goal came during the 69th minute when Tom Clements '08 sent a free kick to the left corner where Alex Cunliffe '07 found room inside the box. Drawing a double-team about 25 yards from the near post, Cunliffe sent a cross to the feet of Mike Troy '07. Troy dribbled along the end line until he sent a shot on goal from 10 yards which deflected off the St. Peter's goalkeeper and into the corner of the net for the game-winning score.
