= 2020 Redwoods Lacrosse Club season =

2nd season in franchise history

2020 Redwoods Lacrosse Club
- League: Premier Lacrosse League
- 2020 record: 3–3
- General Manager: Nat St. Laurent
- Coach: Nat St. Laurent

The 2020 Redwoods Lacrosse Club season was the 2nd season of the Redwoods Lacrosse Club (now the California Redwoods) of the Premier Lacrosse League (PLL). The Redwoods finished with a 3–3 record and lost 13–12 to the Whipsnakes Lacrosse Club in the semifinals.

== Drafts ==
=== Expansion draft ===
Prior to the 2020 Premier Lacrosse League season, the Waterdogs Lacrosse Club was founded and admitted to the league as an expansion team. All of the league's teams at the time were subject to have players drafted by Waterdogs. Two of the Redwoods' players were drafted by the Waterdogs: defender Brian Karalunas and midfielder Wes Berg.

2020 Redwoods Lacrosse Club expansion draft losses
Round	Selection	Player	Position	College	Notes
1	8	Brian Karalunas	Defense	Villanova	Drafted by Waterdogs
1	14	Wes Berg	Midfield	Denver	Drafted by Waterdogs

=== Player entry draft ===
2020 Redwoods Lacrosse Club player entry draft selections
Round	Selection	Player	Position	College	Notes
1	6	Finn Sullivan	Defense	Hofstra	
2	13	Greg Puskuldjian	Faceoff	Adelphi	

=== College draft ===
2020 Redwoods Lacrosse Club college draft selections
Round	Selection	Player	Position	College	Notes
1	6	Peyton Smith	Faceoff	Marist	
2	13	Chris Price	Defense	High Point	

== Season ==
=== Schedule ===
Game	Date	Opponent	Result	Record	Venue	Recap
1	July 25	Whipsnakes	L 9–13	0–1	Zions Bank Stadium	Recap
2	July 28	Chrome	L 11–12	0–2	Zions Bank Stadium	Recap
3	July 29	Chaos	W 8–7 (OT)	1–2	Zions Bank Stadium	Recap
4	August 1	Atlas	W 11–10	2–2	Zions Bank Stadium	Recap
Elimination	August 4	Waterdogs	W 11–8	3–2	Zions Bank Stadium	Recap
Semifinals	August 6	Whipsnakes	L 12–13 (OT)	3–3	Zions Bank Stadium	Recap

=== Game summaries ===
==== Game 1: Whipsnakes ====
July 25, 2020; 4:00 p.m. EDT	Whipsnakes	13–9 (3–2, 8–6, 11–6, 13–9)	Redwoods	Zions Bank Stadium, Herriman; Attendance: 0

Game reference
Zed Williams 3; John Haus 2; Joseph Nardella 2; Jay Carlson 1; Joe LoCascio 1; Tim Muller 1; Matt Rambo 1; Brad Smith 1; Max Tuttle 1	Point scorers	Kyle Harrison 2; Matt Kavanagh 2; Sergio Perkovic 2; Clarke Petterson 2; Myles Jones 1
37	Shots	34

==== Game 2: Chrome ====
July 28, 2020; 9:30 p.m. EDT	Redwoods	11–12 (2–1, 4–10, 6–11, 11–12)	Chrome	Zions Bank Stadium, Herriman; Attendance: 0

Game reference
Sergio Perkovic 5; Ryder Garnsey 2; Brendan Gleason 1; Kyle Harrison 1; Myles Jones 1; Matt Kavanagh 1	Point scorers	Ned Crotty 3; Jesse King 2; Eli Salama 2; Reece Eddy 1; Will Haus 1; Justin Guterding 1; Jordan MacIntosh 1; Jordan Wolf 1
40	Shots	33

==== Game 3: Chaos ====
July 29, 2020; 7:00 p.m. EDT	Chaos	7–8 (OT) (2–0, 3–1, 3–5, 7–7, 0–1)	Redwoods	Zions Bank Stadium, Herriman; Attendance: 0

Game reference
Josh Byrne 2; Troy Reh 2; Curtis Dickson 1; Connor Fields 1; Joey Froccaro 1	Point scorers	Ryder Garnsey 2; Sergio Perkovic 2; Brendan Gleason 1; Myles Jones 1; Clarke Petterson 1; Joe Walters 1
34	Shots	51

==== Game 4: Atlas ====
August 1, 2020; 1:00 p.m. EDT	Redwoods	11–10 (3–3, 4–5, 7–8, 11–10)	Atlas	Zions Bank Stadium, Herriman; Attendance: 0

Game reference
Sergio Perkovic 4; Ryder Garnsey 2; Myles Jones 2; Joe Walters 2; Brent Adams 1	Point scorers	Ryan Brown 2; Bryan Costabile 2; Romar Dennis 2; Trevor Baptiste 1; Connor Buczek 1; Chris Cloutier 1; Rob Pannell 1
37	Shots	39

==== Elimination: Waterdogs ====
August 4, 2020; 7:00 p.m. EDT	Waterdogs	8–11 (1–1, 3–5, 4–7, 8–11)	Redwoods	Zions Bank Stadium, Herriman; Attendance: 0

Game reference
Connor Kelly 3; Ryland Rees 2; Christian Cuccinello 1; Zach Currier 1; Drew Snider 1	Point scorers	Brent Adams 3; Myles Jones 3; Ryder Garnsey 2; Sergio Perkovic 1; Clarke Petterson 1; Joe Walters 1
33	Shots	44

==== Semifinals: Whipsnakes ====
August 6, 2020; 7:00 p.m. EDT	Redwoods	12–13 (OT) (2–4, 6–9, 11–12, 12–12, 12–13)	Whipsnakes	Zions Bank Stadium, Herriman; Attendance: 0

Game reference
Matt Kavanagh 4; Ryder Garnsey 2; Brent Adams 1; Brendan Gleason 1; Patrick Harbeson 1; Jack Near 1; Sergio Perkovic 1; Clarke Petterson 1	Point scorers	Jay Carlson 4; Michael Ehrhardt 4; Mike Chanenchuk 2; Jeremy Sieverts 1; Brad Smith 1; Max Tuttle 1
36	Shots	41

=== Standings ===
2020 Premier Lacrosse League Standings
Team	W	L	PCT	S	SA	SD
Whipsnakes	6	0	1.000	82	51	31
Archers	4	2	.667	64	68	–4
Chrome	3	2	.600	64	64	0
Redwoods	3	3	.500	62	63	–1
Chaos	2	5	.286	70	78	–8
Waterdogs	1	4	.200	47	53	–6
Atlas	1	4	.200	46	58	–12
