= ECAC Lacrosse League =

- Association: NCAA
- Founded: 1999
- Folded: 2014; 12 years ago
- Commissioner: Rudy Keeling
- Sports fielded: 1; men's: 1; women's: 0
- Division: Division I
- No. of teams: 5 (at dissolution)
- Headquarters: Centerville, Massachusetts
- Region: United States

Locations
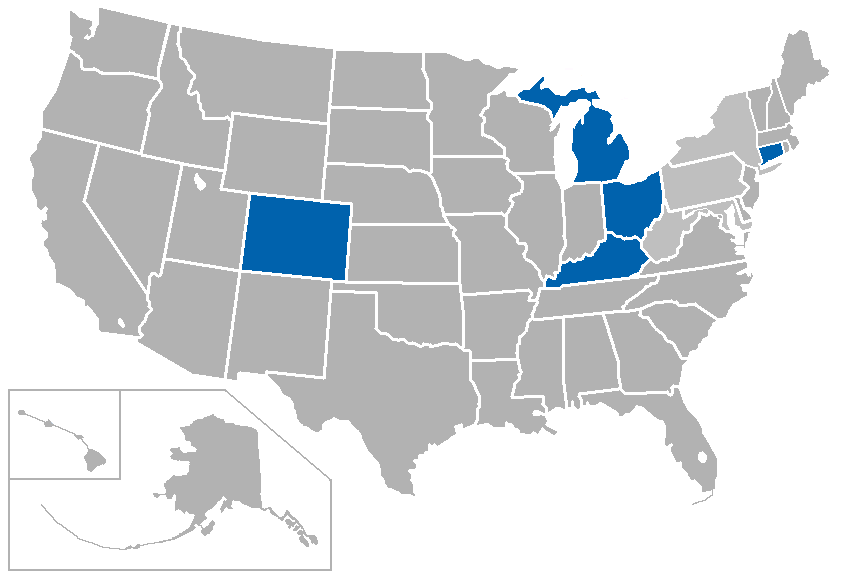

The ECAC Lacrosse League was an American NCAA Division I college athletic conference and part of the Eastern College Athletic Conference. Founded in 1999 with play beginning in 2000, this part of the conference only sponsored men's lacrosse. It disbanded at the end of the 2014 season as an indirect result of the early-2010s NCAA conference realignment.

== History ==
The founding members included Georgetown University, Pennsylvania State University (Penn State), Rutgers University, Stony Brook University, the University of Massachusetts Amherst, and the United States Naval Academy. In 2005, Loyola College in Maryland, Hobart College, and St. John’s University joined the ECAC. And in 2006, Fairfield University joined the league. In 2010, the league added Air Force, Bellarmine, Denver, Ohio State and Quinnipiac, replacing Georgetown, Rutgers and St. John's, who left for the original Big East Conference, and Massachusetts and Penn State, who left for the Colonial Athletic Association. In 2011, the ECAC added the University of Michigan Wolverines who were making their move from club level to NCAA Division I. They became full members in 2013, the same year in which Loyola's lacrosse team joined the rest of the school's sports in the Patriot League.

After the 2013 season, a number of members announced their intention to exit the ECAC. In late May, following a second semi-finals appearance in three years, Denver announced that they would leave the ECAC to join the new Big East Conference for the 2014 season, leaving the ECAC with six teams for that season. In early June, the Big Ten Conference announced the start of conference competition in 2015, removing Michigan and Ohio State from the ECAC after the 2014 season. In mid-June, Fairfield announced it would join the Colonial Athletic Association for the 2015 season. On July 1, Hobart announced it would join the Northeast Conference beginning immediately for the 2014 season. One week later, Bellarmine announced it would become an affiliate of the ASUN Conference (then known as the Atlantic Sun Conference) for the 2015 season. Before Bellarmine's move took effect, the ASUN and Southern Conference (SoCon) announced a lacrosse alliance under which the two leagues split sponsorship of the sport, with women's lacrosse remaining in the ASUN and men's lacrosse shifting to the SoCon. Accordingly, Bellarmine played in the SoCon from the 2015 season until the ASUN established its own men's lacrosse league for the 2022 season. The final ECAC member, Air Force, spent the 2015 season playing as an independent before joining Bellarmine as an affiliate in the SoCon in 2016, and later following them to the ASUN in 2022.

== Final members ==
| Institution | Nickname | Location | Head coach | Field | Joined | Primary conference | Current lacrosse conference |
|---|---|---|---|---|---|---|---|
| United States Air Force Academy | Falcons | Colorado Springs, CO | Eric Seremet | Cadet Lacrosse Stadium | 2010 | Mountain West | ASUN |
| Bellarmine University | Knights | Louisville, KY | Kevin Burns | Owsley B. Frazier Stadium | 2010 | ASUN | ASUN |
| Fairfield University | Stags | Fairfield, CT | Andrew Copelan | Lessing Field | 2006 | MAAC | CAA |
| University of Michigan | Wolverines | Ann Arbor, MI | John Paul | Michigan Stadium | 2013 | Big Ten | Big Ten |
| The Ohio State University | Buckeyes | Columbus, OH | Nick Myers | Jesse Owens Memorial Stadium | 2010 | Big Ten | Big Ten |

=== Previous members ===
| Institution | Nickname | Location | Head coach | Field | Current Lacrosse League | Seasons in ECAC |
|---|---|---|---|---|---|---|
| Stony Brook | Seawolves | Stony Brook, NY | Jim Nagle | Kenneth P. LaValle Stadium | CAA | 2000-2002 |
| UMBC | Retrievers | Catonsville, MD | Don Zimmerman | UMBC Stadium | America East | 2000-2003 |
| Navy | Midshipmen | Annapolis, Maryland | Rick Sowell | Navy–Marine Corps Memorial Stadium | Patriot League | 2000-2003 |
| Georgetown | Hoyas | Washington, D.C. | Kevin Warne | Multi-Sport Field | Big East | 2000-2010 |
| Rutgers | Scarlet Knights | New Brunswick, New Jersey | Brian Brecht | Yurcak Field | Big Ten | 2000-2010 |
| St. John's | Red Storm | New York City, New York | Jason Miller | DaSilva Memorial Field | Big East | 2005-2010 |
| Penn State | Nittany Lions | University Park, Pennsylvania | Jeff Tambroni | Penn State Lacrosse Field | Big Ten | 2000-2010 |
| UMass | Minutemen | Amherst, Massachusetts | Greg Cannella | Garber Field | A-10 | 2000-2010 |
| Quinnipiac | Bobcats | Hamden, Connecticut | Eric Fekete | QU Lacrosse Field | MAAC | 2010-2011 |
| Denver | Pioneers | Denver, CO | Bill Tierney | Peter Barton Lacrosse Stadium | Big East | 2010-2013 |
| Loyola (MD) | Greyhounds | Baltimore, MD | Charley Toomey | Ridley Athletic Complex | Patriot League | 2005-2013 |
| Hobart | Statesmen | Geneva, NY | T.W. Johnson | Boswell Field | A-10 | 2005-2013 |

=== Membership timeline ===
Full members Other Conference Other Conference

== Champions ==
=== Regular season champions ===
| Year | Champion(s) | Conference | Overall |
|---|---|---|---|
| 2014 | Fairfield | 3–1 | 12–4 |
| 2013 | Denver | 6–1 | 12–4 |
| 2012 | Loyola | 6–0 | 18–1 |
| 2011 | Denver | 6–0 | 14–2 |
| 2010 | Denver | 6–0 | 11–4 |
| 2009 | Massachusetts | 6–1 | 9–5 |
| 2008 | Loyola | 6–1 | 7–6 |
| 2007 | Georgetown | 6–0 | 11–2 |
| 2006 | Georgetown | 6–1 | 11–3 |
| 2005 | Massachusetts; Penn State | 5–1; 5–1 | 11–2; 9–5 |
| 2004 | Georgetown | 3–0 | 11–4 |
| 2003 | Georgetown | 4–1 | 11–4 |
| 2002 | Massachusetts | 5–0 | 12–4 |
| 2001 | Georgetown; Massachusetts | 5–1; 5–1 | 11–2; 12–2 |
| 2000 | Georgetown | 6–0 | 11–2 |

=== Playoff champions ===
| Year | Champion | Title Game Opponent | Score | Playoff Location |
|---|---|---|---|---|
| 2014 | Air Force | Fairfield | 9-8 | Jesse Owens Memorial Field, Columbus, Ohio |
| 2013 | Ohio State | Denver | 11-10 | Boswell Field, Geneva, New York |
| 2012 | Loyola | Fairfield | 14-7 | Peter Barton Lacrosse Stadium, Denver |
| 2011 | Denver | Fairfield | 11-9 | Peter Barton Lacrosse Stadium, Denver |

== ECAC teams in the NCAA Tournament ==
| Year | Team(s) | Results |
|---|---|---|
| 2014 | Air Force | First Round |
| 2013 | Denver | Semifinals |
| 2013 | Ohio State | Quarterfinals |
| 2013 | Loyola | First Round |
| 2012 | Loyola | National Champions |
| 2012 | Denver | Quarterfinals |
| 2011 | Denver | Semifinals |
| 2010 | Denver | First Round |
| 2010 | Loyola | First Round |
| 2009 | Massachusetts | First Round |
| 2008 | Loyola | First Round |
| 2007 | Georgetown | Quarterfinals |
| 2007 | Loyola | First Round |
| 2006 | Massachusetts | National Finalist |
| 2006 | Georgetown | Quarterfinals |
| 2005 | Georgetown | Quarterfinals |
| 2005 | Massachusetts | Quarterfinals |
| 2005 | Penn State | First Round |
| 2004 | Georgetown | Quarterfinals |
| 2004 | Rutgers | First Round |
| 2003 | Georgetown | Quarterfinals |
| 2003 | Massachusetts | Quarterfinals |
| 2003 | Penn State | First Round |
| 2003 | Rutgers | First Round |
| 2002 | Georgetown | Quarterfinals |
| 2002 | Massachusetts | Quarterfinals |
| 2002 | Stony Brook | First Round |
| 2001 | Georgetown | First Round |

== Awards ==
=== Offensive Player of the Year ===
| Year | Name | Team |
|---|---|---|
| 2014 | Michael Crampton | Air Force |
| 2013 | Logan Schuss | Ohio State |
| 2012 | Logan Schuss | Ohio State |
| 2011 | Mark Matthews | Denver |
| 2010 | Cooper MacDonnell | Loyola |
| 2009 | Jim Connolly | Massachusetts |
| 2008 | Shane Koppens | Loyola |
| 2007 | Brendan Cannon | Georgetown |
| 2006 | Sean Morris | Massachusetts |
| 2005 | Sean Morris | Massachusetts |
| 2004 | Walid Hajj | Georgetown |
| 2003 | Chris Fiore | Massachusetts |
| 2002 | Steve Dusseau | Georgetown |
| 2001 | Steve Dusseau | Georgetown |
| 2000 | Andy Flick | Georgetown |

=== Rookie of the Year ===
| Year | Name | Team |
|---|---|---|
| 2013 | Carter Brown | Ohio State |
| 2012 | Wes Berg | Denver |
| 2011 | Jamie Faus | Denver |
| 2010 | Logan Schuss | Ohio State |
| 2009 | Mike Sawyer | Loyola |
| 2008 | Jake Hagelin; Kory Kelly | Loyola; Rutgers |
| 2007 | Justin Pennington | Rutgers |
| 2006 | Drew Adams | Penn State |
| 2005 | Daryl Veltman | Hobart |
| 2004 | Trevor Casey | Georgetown |
| 2003 | Greg Havalchak | Rutgers |
| 2002 | Will Jones; Gene Tundo | Penn State; Massachusetts |
| 2001 | Dave Pittard | Navy |
| 2000 | Kyle Sweeney | Georgetown |

=== Goalkeeper of the Year ===
| Year | Name | Team |
|---|---|---|
| 2013 | Dillon Ward | Bellarmine |
| 2012 | Charles Cipriano | Fairfield |
| 2011 | Charles Cipriano | Fairfield |
| 2010 | Jake Hagelin | Loyola |
| 2009 | Doc Schneider | Massachusetts |
| 2008 | Drew Adams | Penn State |
| 2007 | Drew Adams | Penn State |
| 2006 | Drew Adams | Penn State |
| 2005 | Mike Fretwell | Loyola |

=== Defensive Player of the Year ===
| Year | Name | Team |
|---|---|---|
| 2013 | Joe Fletcher | Loyola |
| 2012 | Scott Ratliff | Loyola |
| 2011 | Matt Kawamoto | Ohio State |
| 2010 | Dillon Roy | Denver |
| 2009 | P.T. Ricci | Loyola |
| 2008 | Jerry Lambe | Georgetown |
| 2007 | Jerry Lambe | Georgetown |
| 2006 | Jack Reid | Massachusetts |
| 2005 | Brodie Merrill | Georgetown |
| 2004 | Greg Havalchak | Rutgers |
| 2003 | Greg Havalchak | Rutgers |
| 2002 | Kyle Sweeney | Georgetown |
| 2001 | Kyle Sweeney | Georgetown |
| 2000 | Mickey Jarboe | Navy |

=== Coach of the Year ===
| Year | Name | Team |
|---|---|---|
| 2014 | Eric Seremet | Air Force |
| 2013 | Kevin Burns | Bellarmine |
| 2012 | Charley Toomey | Loyola |
| 2011 | Bill Tierney | Denver |
| 2010 | Bill Tierney | Denver |
| 2009 | Greg Cannella | Massachusetts |
| 2008 | Matt Kerwick; Charley Toomey | Hobart; Loyola |
| 2007 | Dave Urick | Georgetown |
| 2006 | Charley Toomey | Loyola |
| 2005 | Glenn Thiel | Penn State |
| 2004 | Greg Cannella | Massachusetts |
| 2003 | Jim Stagnitta | Rutgers |
| 2002 | Greg Cannella | Massachusetts |
| 2001 | Greg Cannella | Massachusetts |
| 2000 | Dave Urick | Georgetown |

=== Specialist of the Year ===
| Year | Name | Position | Team |
|---|---|---|---|
| 2013 | Scott Ratliff | LSM | Loyola |
| 2012 | Chase Carraro | FO | Denver |

== All-time ECAC season statistic leaders ==
- Points: Sean Morris, Massachusetts (31, 2005)
- Points per game: Steve Dusseau, Georgetown (5.40, 2002)
- Goals: Scott Urick, Georgetown (21, 2000)
- Goals per game: Steve Dusseau, Georgetown (3.6, 2002)
- Assists: Brendan Cannon, Georgetown (18, 2006)
- Assists per game: Brendan Cannon, Georgetown (2.57, 2002)
- Saves: Drew Adams, Penn State (87, 2006)
- Goals against average: Mickey Jarboe, Navy (5.96, 2000)

== See also ==
- ECAC Division II Lacrosse League
