= Ted Spencer =

Current position
- Title: Head coach / Director
- Team: Blue Chip National Team

Playing career
- 1983–1985: UMass Minutemen
- Position: Long-pole defensive midfielder

Coaching career (HC unless noted)
- 1991: Brown (asst.)
- 1991–1995: Yale (asst.)
- 1995–2007: Fairfield

Head coaching record
- Overall: 93–90 (13 seasons)

Accomplishments and honors

Awards
- GWLL Coach of the Year (’02, ’05); USILA North/South Coach (‘01); MLL Award (’01); MAAC Coach of the Year (’96)

Ted Spencer is the former head coach for the Fairfield Stags men's lacrosse team.

Spencer led the Stags to the NCAA Tournament with appearances in 2002 and 2005 after winning the Great Western Lacrosse League Championships in those seasons. He also led the Stags to two ECAC Tournament Championships (1998 and 1999), and three MAAC Championships (1996, 1997 and 1998). He also has developed two All-Americans, 18 All-New England selections and eight Academic All-New England selections. Spencer was selected GWLL Coach of the Year in 2002 and 2005, as well as the 1996 MAAC Coach of the Year.

He is a 1985 graduate of the University of Massachusetts Amherst where he was defensive long-pole midfielder for the men's lacrosse team.

Spencer was the head coach, also, of the Monte Vista High School (Danville, California) lacrosse team from 2013 to 2015, and was head coach of the Westerly High School (Rhode Island) Boys Lacrosse team.

He resides in Fairfield, Connecticut with his wife, Denise, and their children, Ryan-Elizabeth, Ben, and Devin.
