= C. J. Kemp =

American lacrosse player

Personal information
- Nationality: American
- Born: March 11, 1982 (age 43) Potomac, Maryland, U.S.
- Height: 5 ft 10 in (178 cm)
- Weight: 185 lb (84 kg; 13 st 3 lb)

Sport
- Position: Goalie
- MLL team: Rochester Rattlers; Baltimore Bayhawks
- NCAA team: Fairfield University
- Pro career: 2008–

C. J. Kemp (born May 4, 1980 in Potomac, Maryland) is a former professional lacrosse player with the Rochester Rattlers and Baltimore Bayhawks of Major League Lacrosse and an All-American goalkeeper at Fairfield University.

== Professional ==
Kemp was the 32nd pick of the 2004 MLL Supplemental Draft by the Rochester Rattlers. Kemp played for the Rochester Rattlers during the 2004 and 2005 seasons and the Baltimore Bayhawks during the 2006 season.

Kemp is now a mortgage banker with Truist in Bethesda, Maryland.

== College ==
Kemp attended Fairfield University where he was a two-time All-American Honorable Mention selection and the GWLL Player of the Year following the 2002 and 2003 seasons. In 2002, Kemp helped the Stags win the Great Western Lacrosse League Championship and earn the program's first birth in the NCAA Men's Lacrosse Championship tournament. In 2003, Kemp served as team captain for the Stags and finished as the Stags No. 2 ranked goalie with 606 career saves.

== High school ==
Kemp attended the Georgetown Preparatory School in Bethesda, Maryland where he was an All-American goalie and served as Team Captain for the Little Hoyas during his senior season. He participated in the North/South All-Star Game, Maryland Senior All-Star Game and was named 2nd team All-State, 1st team All-Met Washington Post and 2x All-IAC.
