= Timothy Conway =

Timothy Conway may refer to:

- Timmy Conway (born 1942), Irish politician
- Timothy Conway (executive), American businessman
