= Rafferty Stadium =

Lacrosse stadium in Fairfield, Connecticut

Coordinates: 41°9′48″N 73°15′25″W

- Raff

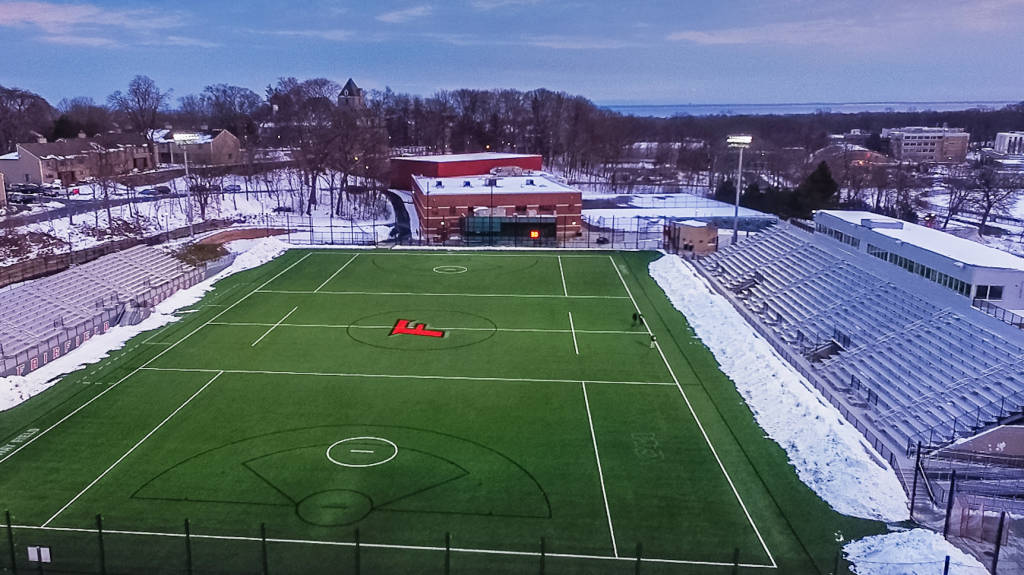
- Aerial view of the stadium
- Interactive map of Rafferty Stadium
- Full name: Conway Field at Rafferty Stadium
- Address: 1073 North Benson Road; Fairfield, Connecticut; United States
- Owner: Fairfield University
- Capacity: 3,500
- Type: Stadium
- Surface: FieldTurf
- Scoreboard: Daktronics
- Current use: Lacrosse

Construction
- Groundbreaking: 2014
- Built: 2014
- Opened: February 2, 2015; 11 years ago
- Cost: $16 million
- Architect: CannonDesign

Tenants
- Fairfield Stags (NCAA); Connecticut Hammerheads (MLL) (2020); Fairfield College Preparatory School

Website
- fairfieldstags.com/rafferty-stadium

Rafferty Stadium is a 3,500-seat lacrosse stadium on the campus of Fairfield University in Fairfield, Connecticut. It is home to the Fairfield Stags men's and women's lacrosse teams. The facility opened officially on February 2, 2015. The stadium is named in recognition of the principal leadership gift from university alumnus Larry Rafferty. The field of the stadium in named Conway Field in acknowledgment of a gift from Tim Conway, another alumnus.

== Facility overview ==
Rafferty Stadium features a Daktronics HD video board and state-of-the-art sound and lights. Conway Field is a FieldTurf playing surface. The stadium also includes a terrace level with a fully enclosed press box that features a media suite, two VIP suites and a production suite to support the video capabilities of the scoreboard, television broadcasts and web streaming. On the ground level are two team rooms, food, beverage and apparel concessions, restrooms, a box office and entry plaza.

The Rafferty Stadium President's Suite is home to an original painting by renowned American sports artist Stephen Holland.

== Notable events ==
- On March 21, 2015, Fairfield University President Jeffrey P. von Arx S.J. officially dedicated and blessed Rafferty Stadium and Conway Field while the women's lacrosse team defeated the Manhattan Jaspers and the men's lacrosse team defeated the then nationally ranked Villanova Wildcats.
- In April 2015, the Colonial Athletic Association (CAA) played its 2015 Men's Lacrosse Championship at Rafferty Stadium after the Fairfield Stags won the CAA regular season title during its inaugural season in the league.
- In September 2024, Fairfield University installed a new Daktronics scoreboard.

=== Professional Lacrosse ===
- In August 2016, three former Stags competed in the first-ever professional sporting event at Rafferty Stadium. Men's lacrosse standouts Greg Downing ‘07, Mike Bocklet ‘07 and former Stag Matt Bocklet of the Denver Outlaws defeated the New York Lizards, 20–17, in a Major League Lacrosse (MLL) Semi-final game.
- In January 2020, the newly formerd Connecticut Hammerheads of the MLL announced that Rafferty Stadium would be their home venue.
- The Premier Lacrosse League is slated to host week 7 of its 2022 season at Rafferty Stadium on July 23-24, 2022.
- The PLL announced their return to Raffery Stadium for week 5 of its 2023 season on July 14-15, 2023.

Date	Games	League	Attendance	Ref.
August 13, 2016	Denver Outlaws 20–17 New York Lizards	MLL; Semifinals	6,423	
July 23, 2022	Redwoods 16–15 Atlas	PLL	TBD	
July 23, 2022	Whipsnakes 14–12 Chaos	PLL	TBD	
July 24, 2022	Cannons 12–17 Archers	PLL	TBD	
July 24, 2022	Chrome 10–11 Waterdogs	PLL	TBD	
July 14, 2023	Waterdogs - Whipsnakes	PLL	TBD	
July 14, 2023	Archers - Redwoods	PLL	TBD	
July 15, 2023	Chrome - Cannons	PLL	TBD	
July 15, 2023	Atlas - Chaos	PLL	TBD	
