= Booklet =

Booklet may refer to:

- A small book or group of pages
- A pamphlet
- A type of tablet computer
- Postage stamp booklet, made up of one or more small panes of postage stamps in a cardboard cover
- Liner notes, writings found in booklets which come inserted into the compact disc or DVD jewel case or the equivalent packaging for vinyl records and cassettes
- Digital booklet, the digital equivalent of liner notes that often accompany digital music purchases
- Nokia Booklet 3G, a netbook computer
- Programme (booklet), available for patrons attending live events

== See also ==
- Book (disambiguation)
- Bocklet, a German-Austrian surname
