= Bocklet =

Bocklet is a surname that occurs mainly in Germany and Austria. Notable people with the surname include:

- Carl Maria von Bocklet (1801–1881), composer, musician, and teacher of music from the Austrian Empire
- Mike Bocklet (born 1984), American lacrosse player and coach
- Reinhold Bocklet (1943–2025), German politician

== See also ==
- Bad Bocklet, a municipality in the German district of Bad Kissingen
