= Mike Bocklet =

American lacrosse player and coach

Current position
- Title: Head coach
- Team: John Jay High School Wolves

Biographical details
- Born: November 3, 1984 (age 41); South Salem, New York, U.S.

Playing career
- 2004–2007: Fairfield Stags
- 2015: Denver Outlaws
- 2019: Premier Lacrosse Redwoods and Chaos
- Position: Attack

Coaching career (HC unless noted)
- 2010–2012: Cortland (assistant)
- 2012–2014: Dartmouth (assistant)
- 2014–present: Purchase

Accomplishments and honors

Awards
- 2017 MLL All-Star; 2007 Tewaaraton Watch List; 2005 & 2007 All-New England; 2005 GWLL Championship; 2003 High School All American

Mike Bocklet (born November 3, 1984) is a professional lacrosse player with the Chaos of Premier Lacrosse League and the head coach of the John Jay High School men's lacrosse team in Cross River, NY. Bocklet is the director and co-founder of the X10 Mountain Lacrosse Academy and Moonlight Lacrosse, LLC.

== Professional career ==
Bocklet was drafted in the 4th round (45th overall) of the 2007 Major League Lacrosse Supplemental Draft by the Long Island Lizards. In 2015, Inside Lacrosse named Bocklet its First Year Player of the Year after producing 32 goals and 16 assists for the Denver Outlaws. He was the Warrior Offensive Player of the Week twice. Mike and his brothers, Matt and Chris, played together for the Outlaws. Bocklet was selected to play in the 2017 MLL All-Star Game in Sacramento, California.

== Collegiate career ==
Bocklet attended Fairfield University where he served as captain of the Stags during his senior season and finished his career ranked among the best players in program history statistically. He tallied 147 points, fourth all-time, on 95 goals, fifth in program history and 52 assists, sixth in program history. In 2007, Bocklet earned a selection to the prestigious USILA North-South game and to the Tewaaraton Trophy Watchlist, given to the nation's most outstanding NCAA lacrosse player. In 2004, Bocklet helped lead the Stags to the Great Western Lacrosse League Championship and the NCAA Men's Lacrosse Championship Tournament. Bocklet was named Second Team All-New England in 2005 and 2007 and Second Team All-GWLL in 2004 and 2005.

== High school career ==
Bocklet attended John Jay High School where he was named a high school All-American and was the New York State Section I Point Leader, scoring 108 points with 54 goals and 54 assists during his senior season.
