= Cohasset High School =

Public school in Massachusetts, US

Coordinates: 42°13′57.53″N 70°48′32.51″W

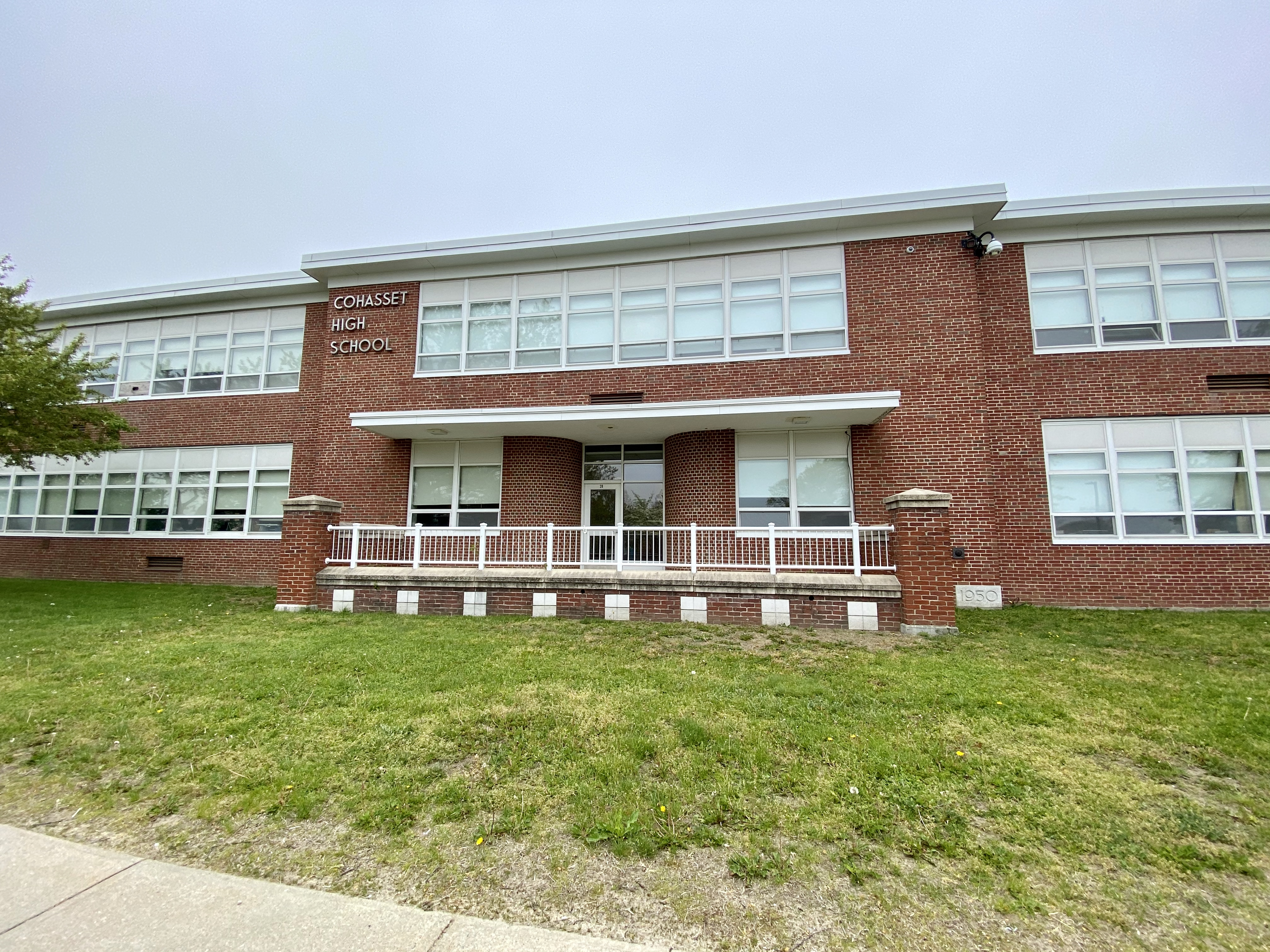
- 143 Pond Street; Cohasset, MA 02025; United States

Information
- Type: Public
- Established: 1838
- Principal: Brian Scott
- Staff: 39.48 (FTE)
- Grades: 9-12
- Enrollment: 406 (2023-2024)
- Student to teacher ratio: 10.28
- Campus: Suburban
- Colors: Navy, silver and white
- Mascot: Skipper
- Rivals: Hull, Scituate, Norwell, Archbishop Williams ( Soccer only)
- Newspaper: The Spinnaker
- Website: https://highschool.cohassetk12.org/

Cohasset High School is a public high school located in Cohasset, Massachusetts, United States. It is located at 143 Pond St. and has an enrollment of 431 students in grades 9-12. A majority of the school's teams are named the "Skippers" and the school colors are navy blue, silver, and white. Cohasset Middle School, which serves grades 6–8, is attached to the high school; formerly under the same principal, it is now separately administered.

== History ==
The high school opened in 1951, replacing an originally all-grades central high school known as the Osgood School.

Football coach and science teacher Jeffrey Knight was indicted in early 2019 on charges related to a sexual assault on a Cohasset Middle School student in 2018. In December 2021, he was found guilty on two charges of inappropriate touching of a child. The school administration was accused of delaying reporting the assault; Carolyn Connolly, principal of the high school and the junior high school, was placed on leave in September 2018 and terminated in April 2019. The high school and middle school were then split, with separate principals. In late 2021, Connolly sued for wrongful termination.

In February 2023, the former assistant facilities manager of the Town of Cohasset was arraigned on charges related to a cryptocurrency mining operation that was run from a crawl space under the high school, using electricity illegally diverted from the school.

== Sports ==
Cohasset High School offers multiple sports, including:

- Soccer
- American football
- Lacrosse
- Basketball
- Track and field
- Baseball
- Softball
- Cross country
- Field Hockey
- Ice hockey
- Wrestling
- Volleyball
- Ultimate

== Notable alumni ==
- Kate Bosworth, actress
- Keith Elam, rapper
- Jack Murphy, Major League Lacrosse goalie
- Stephen Bowen, astronaut
- Nancy Walls Carell, actress
- Walt Sweeney, NFL football player
- Dan Toomey, news reporter
- Mike Monaco, sportscaster
