= Michael Waldvogel =

American lacrosse player and coach

Current position
- Title: Head coach
- Team: Fairfield

Coaching career (HC unless noted)
- 1980–2002: Yale

Accomplishments and honors

Awards
- 1996 National Lacrosse Hall of Fame

Michael J. Waldvogel (born Levittown, New York) is a member of the National Lacrosse Hall of Fame and currently the head coach of the Fairfield University women’s lacrosse team.

== Playing career ==
Waldvogel played lacrosse at Levittown Division High School where he earned first team All-County honors in 1964 and 1965. He played defense and midfield at Cortland State, earning First Team All-America honors for defense in 1968 and 1969.

He played in the 1969 North-South Collegiate All-Star game. He went on to play for the US National Team in 1974 and 1978.

== Coaching career ==
Waldvogel began coaching as an assistant at Cornell University from 1970 to 1980. He was the men's lacrosse head coach at Yale University from 1980 to 2002 where he is the winningest coach in program history. He led the Bulldogs to three NCAA Tournaments and three consecutive Ivy League crowns from 1988–1990. He coached the US National Team in 1990. He was named the sixth head coach of the Fairfield University women’s lacrosse team on June 2, 2008.

== Contributions ==
He has served the game of lacrosse in the NCAA and on a national level during his career. From 1989 to 1998 he was the secretary/treasurer of the USLCA, with a membership of over 5,000. He served as the US delegate to the International Lacrosse Federation from 1993 to 2001. From 1989 to 1994 he was a member of the NCAA Men’s Lacrosse Championship Committee and served on the NCAA Men’s Lacrosse Rules Committee.
