= Marist Red Foxes men's lacrosse =

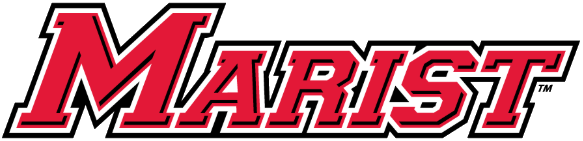
- Founded: 1980; 46 years ago
- University: Marist University
- Athletic director: Tim Murray
- Head coach: Dave Scarcello (2nd season)
- Stadium: Leonidoff Field (capacity: 5,000)
- Location: Poughkeepsie (town), New York
- Conference: Metro Atlantic Athletic Conference
- Nickname: Marist Red Foxes
- Colors: Red and white

NCAA Tournament appearances
- 2005, 2015, 2019, 2023, 2026

Conference Tournament championships
- 2005, 2015, 2019, 2023, 2026

Conference regular season championships
- 2014, 2019, 2026

The Marist men's lacrosse team represents Marist University in National Collegiate Athletic Association (NCAA) Division I men's lacrosse. Marist currently competes as a member of the Metro Atlantic Athletic Conference (MAAC).

== History ==
The men's lacrosse team has been to three NCAA Tournaments after winning the MAAC lacrosse titles in 2005, 2015 and 2019. In 2005 they would go on to play eventual national champion Johns Hopkins in the first round. Marist was soundly defeated 22-6. In the 2015 tournament #20 Marist defeated Bryant University 10-6 in an NCAA play in game. However #2 ranked Syracuse had too much talent for the Foxes in the first-round game, winning 20-8. Originating as a club sport during the 1970s, men's lacrosse subsequently became an NCAA Division III varsity sport and by the early 1980s, began transitioning up to Division I. In 1981, the Marist men's lacrosse team captured the Knickerbocker Conference title. Fairfield coach Andy Copelan led Marist to their first NCAA tournament.

== Notable athletes and coaches ==
- Andrew Copelan

== Annual record ==
| Year | W | L | T | Pct. | Conf. rank | Playoffs | NR | RPI | SOS | PR |
|---|---|---|---|---|---|---|---|---|---|---|
| 2026 | 12 | 5 | 0 | .706 | T–1st | MAAC Title, NCAA First Round | | | | |
| 2025 | 8 | 8 | 0 | .500 | 4th | | | | | |
| 2024 | 8 | 7 | 0 | .533 | T–4th | | | | | |
| 2023 | 10 | 8 | 0 | .556 | 3rd | MAAC Title, NCAA Play In ^{(2)} | | | | |
| 2022 | 7 | 8 | 0 | .467 | T–1st | | | | | |
| 2021 | 3 | 1 | 0 | .750 | 6th | | | | | |
| 2020 | 3 | 3 | 0 | .500 | | | | 31 | 59 | 23 |
| 2019 | 10 | 7 | 0 | .588 | 1st | MAAC Title, NCAA Play In ^{(3)} | | 26 | 62 | 52 |
| 2018 | 3 | 12 | 0 | .200 | 5th | | | 37 | 19 | 44 |
| 2017 | 10 | 6 | 0 | .625 | 4th | | | 33 | 21 | 36 |
| 2016 | 9 | 7 | 0 | .563 | 4th | | | 35 | 23 | 30 |
| 2015 | 14 | 4 | 0 | .778 | 1st | MAAC Title, NCAA First Round ^{(4)} | 20 | 20 | 37 | 29 |
| 2014 | 6 | 9 | 0 | .400 | 4th | | | 45 | 45 | 42 |
| 2013 | 10 | 4 | 0 | .714 | 2nd | | | 34 | 60 | 33 |
| 2012 | 6 | 8 | 0 | .429 | 3rd | | | 17 | 9 | 17 |
| 2011 | 8 | 7 | 0 | .533 | 5th | | | 26 | 26 | 16 |
| 2010 | 8 | 7 | 0 | .533 | 3rd | | | 20 | 25 | 14 |
| 2009 | 4 | 9 | 0 | .308 | 3rd | | | 35 | 40 | 34 |
| 2008 | 3 | 13 | 0 | .188 | 1st | | | 19 | 41 | 12 |
| 2007 | 6 | 9 | 0 | .400 | 1st | | | 20 | 39 | 17 |
| 2006 | 6 | 7 | 0 | .400 | 1st | | | 20 | 39 | 17 |
| 2005 | 8 | 8 | 0 | .500 | 1st | MAAC Title, NCAA First Round ^{(5)} | | 20 | 39 | 17 |

^{(1)(6)} Laxpower / LaxBytes / Laxnumbers Power Ratings
^{(2)} Lost to Delaware in 2023 NCAA Play-in game
^{(3)} Lost to UMBC in 2019 NCAA Play-in game
^{(4)} Defeated Bryant 10-6 in 2015 NCAA Play-in game, lost to Syracuse in NCAA First Round
^{(5)} Defeated Bryant 10-6 in 2005 NCAA Play-in game, lost to Syracuse in NCAA First Round
