= Jack Murphy (lacrosse) =

American lacrosse player

Personal information
- Born: Cohasset, Massachusetts, U.S.

Sport
- Position: Goalie
- NCAA team: Mass Maritime (2011); Fairfield University (2012–2014)
- MLL draft: 59th overall, 2014; Boston Cannons
- MLL teams: Boston Cannons (2015–2018)
- Pro career: 2012–2018

Jack Murphy (born in Boston, Massachusetts) is a professional lacrosse player with the Boston Cannons of Major League Lacrosse. He was the 2015 ECAC Goalkeeper of the Year while playing for Fairfield University.

== High school ==
Murphy attended Cohasset High School where earned four varsity letters. He earned US Lacrosse All-America accolades during his senior season after stopping 248 shots and posting a 4.04 goals against average (GAA).

== College ==
Murphy initially attended Mass Maritime where he started 15 times as freshman, earned Second-Team All-Pilgrim League honors, and was named NCAA Academic All-America. He stopped over 57 percent of the shots he faced and posted an 11.09 GAA for the season.

Murphy then transferred to Fairfield University where he eventually finished ranked fifth all-time for saves (321). As a senior captain, Murphy was ranked seventh nationally for goals against average (8.35) and was named an USILA North/South All-Star, NEILA East/West All-Star, ECAC Goalkeeper of the Year, ECAC All-First Team, and the ECAC Championship All-Tournament Team.

== Professional ==
Murphy was selected in the 8th round of the 2014 MLL Collegiate Draft by the Boston Cannons. In 2017, Murphy became the starting goalie for Boston Cannons.
