= SoccerPlus Connecticut =

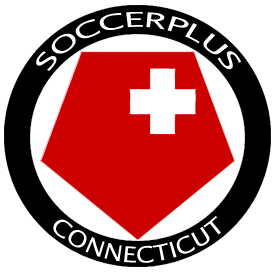
- Full name: SoccerPlus Connecticut
- Nickname: Reds
- Founded: 2006
- Ground: Veterans Memorial Stadium
- Chairman: (United States) Shawn Kelly
- Manager: (United States) Tony DiCicco
- Coach: (United States) Lisa Cole
- League: Women's Premier Soccer League
- 2008: 1st, East North Division; Playoff Conference Finals
Home colors	Away colors

SoccerPlus Connecticut is an American women's soccer team, founded in 2006. The team is a member of the Women's Premier Soccer League, the third tier of women's soccer in the United States and Canada. The team plays in the North Division of the East Conference.

The team plays its home games at the Veterans Memorial Stadium in New Britain, Connecticut. The club's colors are red and white.

== Players ==
=== Notable former players ===
The following former players have played at the professional and/or international level:

- Niki Cross
- Manya Makoski
- Brett Maron
- Tiffany Weimer
- Katie Schoepfer

== Year-by-year ==
Year	Division	League	Reg. season	Playoffs
2007	2	WPSL	3rd, East North	Conference Divisional Round
2008	2	WPSL	1st, East North	Conference Finals

== Honors ==
- WPSL East North Division Champions 2008

== Competition history ==
- 2007 USASA U23 - National Champions
- 2007 USASA Open Cup - Bronze medal

== Coaches ==
- (United States) Tony DiCicco 2007-2008
- (United States) Lisa Cole 2007-2008
- Chris Bart-Williams 2009–Present, Former Sheffield Wednesday and FA Premier League player.
- Eleri Earnshaw 2009–Present, Former Arsenal Ladies and FA Women's Premier League player.

== Stadia ==
- Veterans Stadium (New Britain, CT) 2007–present

== Stadium history ==
Founded in 2006, the Reds played their home matches at Veterans Memorial Stadium—a multi-purpose venue opened in 1982 with a capacity of approximately 8,448 .
