= Fairfield Stags men's lacrosse =

- Founded: 1973
- University: Fairfield University
- Head coach: Andrew Baxter (2019–present season)
- Stadium: Rafferty Stadium (capacity: 3,500)
- Location: Fairfield, Connecticut
- Conference: CAA
- Nickname: Stags
- Colors: Red

NCAA Tournament appearances
- 2002, 2005

Conference Tournament championships
- 1998 (ECAC), 1999 (ECAC)

Conference regular season championships
- (8) 1996 (MAAC), 1997 (MAAC), 1998 (MAAC), 2002 (GWLL), 2005 (GWLL), 2014 (ECAC), 2015 (CAA), 2016 (CAA)

The Fairfield Stags men's lacrosse team represents Fairfield University in Fairfield, Connecticut and competes in the Coastal Athletic Association of NCAA Division I. The Stags have won eight regular season conference titles since 1996 and competed in the NCAA Division I men's lacrosse tournament in 2002 and 2005. The Stags play their home games at the new lacrosse-only Rafferty Stadium.

== History ==
As a Jesuit university, Fairfield shares a unique historical connection to the discovery of modern-day lacrosse. Jesuit missionaries first witnessed the game of "baggataway" being played amongst Native Americans during the 17th century. According to histories of the game, it was Saint John de Brebeuf S.J., a French Jesuit missionary in Canada, who named the present-day version of the Indian game lacrosse because the stick used reminded him of a bishop's crosier, pronounced la crosse in French. Saint John de Brebeuf, S.J. is memorialized at Fairfield University with the #1 de Brebeuf Townhouse Unit named in his honor.

=== Dawn of the Stags ===
The Fairfield Stags men's lacrosse program first began in 1973 as a club team. Future Fairfield University Athletic Hall of Famer Will Mraz was a founding member and the offensive leader of the inaugural club team. The first coach of the Fairfield University Lacrosse Club was Ken Gilstein, Cornell '70, who coached the team during the 1972, 1973, 1976 and 1977 seasons. It was led by standout players Bob Rupp, and John Hughes in the 70s and John Callegari, future Fairfield University Athletic Hall of Famer Hugh "Skeets" Coyle, Joe Sargent, Mike Hone, Kevin Kuryla and Rich MacDonough in the 80s, the club team established itself as amongst the best in New England. In 1987, the team had an undefeated 11-0 season and won the New England Club Championship.

=== Red Stags rising ===
Fairfield elevated the lacrosse program to NCAA Division I in 1993 with Tom McClelland at the helm. The Stags first victory as a varsity program came in its very first game with an 11-6 defeat of a visiting St. Joseph's team. In 1996, Ted Spencer took the helm and Fairfield became a founding member of an eight-team Metro Atlantic Athletic Conference (MAAC) lacrosse league. With Ted Spencer as coach, the team went undefeated in the first year of MAAC lacrosse league play followed by three consecutive league titles (1996, 1997 and 1998) and two ECAC tournament championships (1998 and 1999). In 2000, Fairfield became an independent program. In 2001, the university program joined the Great Western Lacrosse League (GWLL) paving the way for a new era in Stags lacrosse. Ted Spencer guided the Stags to great success on the national stage including two NCAA Tournament appearances (2002 and 2005), two Great Western Lacrosse League Championships (2002 and 2005), and developed 2 All-Americans (C. J. Kemp and Greg Downing) along with 21 All-New England selections and 8 Academic All-New England selections.

=== NCAA Tournament time ===
Matt Baglio '04 to Mike Bocklet '07

In 2002, the Stags finished in first place in the GWLL and received the league's automatic bid to the 2002 NCAA tournament. Making the program's first postseason visit, the Stags fell to UMass in the first round. At the conclusion of the season, the Stags were selected as the winner of the Joseph (Frenchy) Julien Memorial Award for Sportsmanship.

The 2005 season will go down as one of the greatest in Fairfield history with the Stags' finishing as the 15th ranked team in the nation. Not one for dramatics, the Stags won the Great Western Lacrosse League and earned a trip to the 2005 NCAA Tournament with a dramatic victory over then 12th ranked Denver in the last game of the season. In the 1st round of the 2005 NCAA Tournament, the Stags fell to eventual 2005 National Finalist, Duke.

The Stags first official season as a member of the ECAC Lacrosse League in 2006 proved a successful one with Stags posting a winning league record. Major victories included wins over Harvard and then 16th ranked Loyola. The victory over Loyola marked the program's first win over the Greyhounds and included the now infamous hidden ball goal.

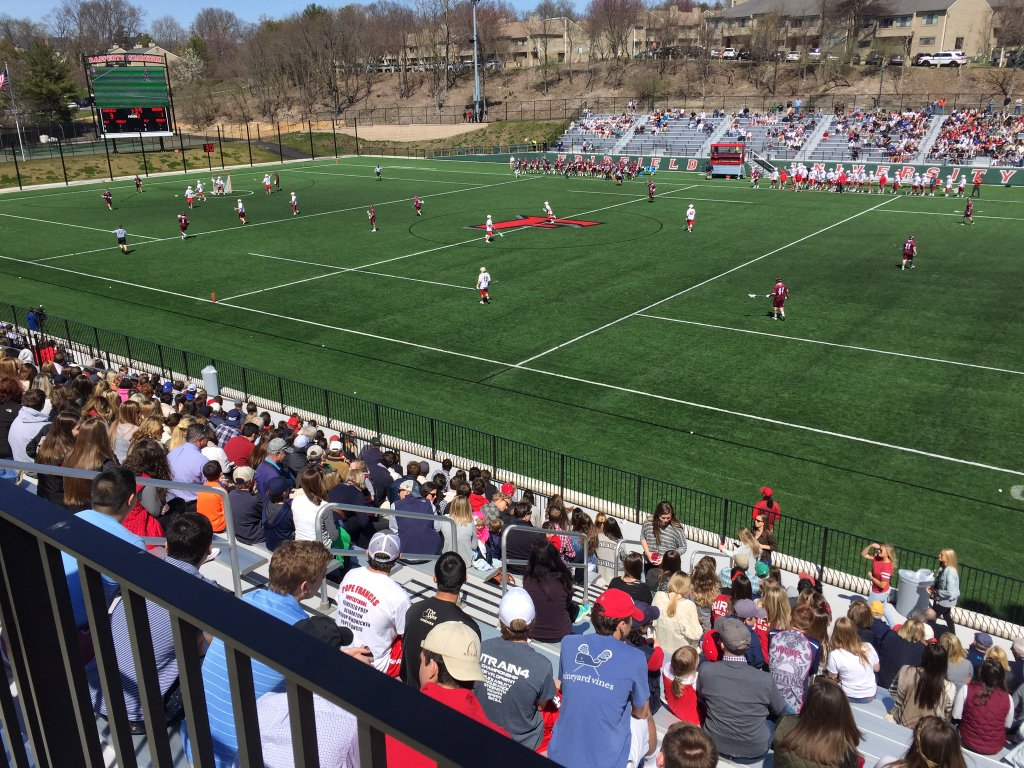
Game day at Rafferty Stadium

=== Copelan era ===
Andrew Copelan became the third head coach in the history of the program on August 25, 2008. On April 21, 2013, men's lacrosse set the school record for the defeat of the highest ranked opponent when the Stags upset the then no. 1 nationally ranked Denver Pioneers 9-8. The previous record was set on March 13, 2010, when the Stags upset the then no. 3 nationally ranked (and eventual 2010 NCAA tournament runner-up) Notre Dame Fighting Irish 10–8 while competing in the inaugural 'Beating Cancer With A Stick Classic' at The Kinkaid School in Houston, Texas. During the 2015 season, the Stags achieved a number of firsts in dedicating the program's new state-of-the-art lacrosse only Rafferty Stadium and winning the Regular Season Title during its inaugural season in the Colonial Athletic Association.

== All-time head coaches ==
Years	Head coach	Record	Postseason
1993–1995	Tom McClelland	8-27	-
1996–2008	Ted Spencer	93-90	2002 NCAA, 2005 NCAA
2008–2019	Andrew Copelan	87-78	
2019–	Andrew Baxter	39-37	
-	Total	220-238	-

== Annual records ==
Year	Wins	Losses	Percent	Conference	Playoffs	National Rank	RPI	SOS	Power Rating ^{(1)}
2024	8	7	.533	3rd	CAA Semifinals		46	47	42
2023	5	9	.357	5th			57	51	54
2022	7	7	.500	4th (t)					
2021	2	9	.182	6th			16	38	48
2020	5	2	.714				16	38	48
2019	5	9	.357	6th			53	49	57
2018	4	11	.267	6th			50	32	
2017	5	9	.357	5th			39	25	
2016	9	8	.529	1st	CAA Finals ^{(2)}		22	10	
2015	9	7	.563	1st	CAA Semifinals		34	51	
2014	12	4	.750	1st		18	19	39	19
2013	8	7	.550	4th			19	24	29
2012	12	4	.750	3rd		15	11	26	23
2011	8	8	.500	3rd			23	21	27
2010	8	6	.575	3rd			25	26	26
2009	7	6	.542	3rd			28	29	29
2008	4	9	.500	6th			45	27	36
2007	6	6	.500	5th			26	27	26
2006	6	7	.490	3rd			34	25	28
2005	11	5	.700	2nd	NCAA 1st Round ^{(3)}	15		31	28
2004	5	9	.400	4th			35	25	36
2003	5	6	.460	4th				26	33
2002	7	6	.520	3rd	NCAA 1st Round ^{(4)}	19		26	27
2001	7	8	.420	4th				28	28

^{(1)}Laxpower Power Rating
^{(2)} Lost CAA Finals 4-2 to Towson.
^{(3)} Lost NCAA 1st round 23-4 to Duke.
^{(4)} Lost NCAA 1st round 14-7 to Massachusetts.

== Awards ==
=== All-American ===
- Spencer Steele (Pre-Season, 1999)
- Peter Shanley (Pre-Season, 2001)
- Troy Bamann (Pre-Season, 2002)
- C. J. Kemp (2002)
- Rob Scipioni (Pre-Season, 2002)
- Peter Vlahakis (Pre-Season, 2002, 2004)
- Tom Werney (Pre-Season, 2004)
- Greg Downing (2005, 2006, 2007)
- Sean Bannon (Pre-Season, 2011)
- Brent Adams (2012)
- Charlie Cipriano (2012)
- Colin McLinden (Pre-Season, 2015)
- TJ Neubauer (2016)
- Colin Burke (2016)
- Dylan Beckwith (2020)

=== USILA Scholar All-American ===
- Charlie Cipriano (2012)
- Sam Snow (2013)
- Max Buchanan (2015)
- Tristan Sperry (2015)
- Andrew Eidenshink (2017)
- Jake Knostman (2017)
- Will Fox (2018)
- Travis Ford (2020)
- Taylor Strough (2020)

=== USILA North-South All Stars ===
- Tom Saunders (1997)
- Devin Laden (1998)
- J.T. Groarke (1999)
- Mark Beckwith (2000)
- Spencer Steele (2000)
- Ted Spencer (North Coach, 2001)
- Peter Shanley (2001)
- Rob Scipioni (2002)
- Marc Torrey (2002)
- C. J. Kemp (2003)
- Kris Klein (2003)
- Peter Vlahakis (2004)
- Mike Bocklet (2007)
- Greg Downing (2007)
- Matt Petre (2009)
- Kevin Peters (2010)
- Brent Adams (2012)
- Charlie Cipriano (2012)
- Brendan McTague (2012)
- Drew Palmer (2012)
- Jack Murphy (2015)
- Max Buchanan (2015)
- Drew Federico (2015)
- Tristan Sperry (2015)

=== First Team All-New England ===
- Spencer Steele (1999, 2000)
- Rob Scipioni (2002)
- Joe Beaudet (2002)
- Mike Bocklet (2005)
- Greg Downing (2005, 2006, 2007)
- Chris Atwell (2007)
- Matt Scanlon (2007, 2008)
- Chris Ajemian (2008)
- Brent Adams (2010, 2012)
- Sean Bannon (2010)
- Sam Snow (2012)
- TJ Neubauer (2015, 2016)

=== League Coach of the Year ===
- Ted Spencer (MAAC, 1996; GWLL, 2002, 2005)
- Andrew Copelan (CAA, 2015)

=== League Player of the Year ===
- Matt Callaghan (MAAC, 1996, 1998)
- Spencer Steele (MAAC, 1999)
- C. J. Kemp (GWLL, 2002)
- Greg Downing (Offensive, GWLL, 2005)
- Charlie Cipriano (Keeper, ECAC, 2011, 2012)
- Jack Murphy (Goalie, ECAC, 2014)
- Colin Burke (CAA, 2016)

=== League Scholar of the Year ===
- Jake Knostman (CAA, 2017)

=== First Team All-League ===
- Paul Caulfield (MAAC, 1996)
- Tom Saunders (MAAC, 1996, 1997)
- Devin Laden (MAAC) 1996, 1998)
- Matt Callaghan (MAAC, 1996, 1997, 1998)
- Spencer Steele (MAAC, 1999)
- Troy Bamann (GWLL, 2001)
- Matt Buecker (GWLL, 2002)
- Rob Scipioni (GWLL, 2002)
- C.J. Kemp (GWLL, 2002)
- Kris Klein (GWLL, 2003)
- Greg Downing (GWLL, 2005, ECAC 2006, 2007)
- Matt Scanlon (ECAC, 2008)
- Joe Marra (ECAC, 2010)
- Brent Adams (ECAC, 2010, 2011, 2012)
- Charlie Cipriano (ECAC, 2011, 2012)
- Sam Snow (ECAC, 2012)
- Jack Murphy (Goalie, ECAC, 2014)
- Max Buchanan (CAA, 2015)
- Tristan Sperry (CAA, 2015)
- TJ Neubauer (CAA, 2015, 2016)
- Tyler Behring (CAA, 2016)
- Colin Burke (CAA, 2016)
- Taylor Strough (CAA, 2022)

== All-Time statistic leaders ==
=== Career leaders ===
- Goals: Spencer Steele (147, 1997-00)
- Assists: J.T. Groarke (119, 1996–99)
- Points: Matt Callaghan (247, 1995–98)
- Saves: Sam Peterson (1077, 1994–97)
- Face-offs won: Peter Vlahakis (620, 2001–04)
- Face-offs win percentage: Peter Vlahakis (.627, 2001–04)

=== Single-game leaders ===
- Goals: Spencer Steele (7, 1999) and Rob Scipioni (7, 2000)

=== Single-season leaders ===
- Goals: Spencer Steele (48, 1999)
- Assists: Matt Callaghan (33, 1998) and J.T. Groarke (33, 1999)
- Points: Matt Callaghan (75, 1997) and Spencer Steele (75, 1999)
- Saves: Sam Peterson (289, 1996)
- Face-offs won: Peter Vlahakis (197, 2004)
- Face-offs win percentage: Peter Vlahakis (.654, 2004)

== Stags in the MLL/PLL ==
Twelve Stags have been drafted by Major League Lacrosse and one by the National Lacrosse League. Peter Vlahakis is the leading face-off man in MLL history holding four MLL All-Time face-off records and was selected to the 2007 and 2008 MLL All-Star Game. Greg Downing was the sixth overall pick in the 2007 MLL Collegiate Draft and was selected to the 2008 MLL All-Star Game. The following Stag players were selected in the Major League Lacrosse draft:

Player	Year	Team
Spencer Steele	2000	Bridgeport Barrage, New Jersey Pride
C. J. Kemp	2003	Rochester Rattlers, Baltimore Bayhawks
Peter Vlahakis	2004	Long Island Lizards, New Jersey Pride
Nate Bauers	2004	Washington Bayhawks
Greg Downing	2007	Boston Cannons, Boston Blazers
Mike Bocklet	2007	Long Island Lizards
Matt Scanlon	2008	Denver Outlaws
Chris Atwell	2009	Boston Cannons
Chris Ajemian	2009	Boston Cannons
Joe Marra	2010	Chicago Machine
Brent Adams	2012	Chesapeake Bayhawks
Charlie Cipriano	2012	Denver Outlaws
Sam Snow	2013	Denver Outlaws
Marshall Johnson	2013	Rochester Rattlers
Jack Murphy	2014	Boston Cannons
TJ Neubauer	2016	Rochester Rattlers
Bryce Ford	2024	Maryland Whipsnakes

== Stags in the PLL ==
- Bryce Ford (2024): Drafted 32nd overall by the Maryland Whipsnakes in the 2025 PLL Draft. Spent five years at Fairfield before a graduate year at Maryland.

== See also ==
- NCAA Men's Lacrosse Championship (1971– )
- Wingate Memorial Trophy (1934–1970)
