= Brett Maron =

American soccer goalkeeper (born 1986)

Personal information
- Full name: Brett Elizabeth Maron
- Date of birth: June 2, 1986 (age 40)
- Place of birth: Billerica, Massachusetts, United States
- Height: 5 ft 8 in (1.73 m)
- Position: Goalkeeper

Team information
- Current team: Kristianstads DFF
- Number: 1

College career
Years	Team	Apps	(Gls)
2004–2007	Fairfield Stags		

Senior career*
Years	Team	Apps	(Gls)
2007	SoccerPlus Connecticut		
2008	Fram		
2009–2010	Kristianstads	8	(0)
2010	Atlanta Beat	5	(0)
2011	magicJack	4	(0)
2012	Turbine Potsdam		
2012	Valur	16	(0)
2013–2021	Kristianstads	114	(0)
2022	Kristianstads	0	(0)
2024–	Kristianstads	0	(0)
- * Club domestic league appearances and goals as of 6 May 2024

Brett Elizabeth Maron (born June 2, 1986) is an American soccer goalkeeper.

== Collegiate career ==
Maron played college soccer for Fairfield University where she earned honors as SoccerBuzz First Team All-Northeast Region and NSCAA Third Team All-Northeast Region in 2006 and twice as Metro Atlantic Athletic Conference (MAAC) Defensive Player of the Year and MAAC Goalkeeper of the Year in 2005 and 2006. She backstopped the Stags to the 2005 MAAC Tournament championship and a berth in the 2005 NCAA Women's Soccer Championship. During her four-year career, Maron posted 34 wins, which is third all-time in program history. She finished second in school history with 24 shutouts, falling short by 0.5 shutouts, having played in the NCAA rules era of not splitting shutouts between keepers. Maron played 6,911 minutes in her career, with a goals-against average of 1.11. She recorded 376 saves, a dozen short of the school record in that category as well.

== Professional career ==
Maron began her professional soccer career with SoccerPlus Connecticut of the Women's Premier Soccer League in 2007. She then played for Afturelding FC of the Icelandic Women's Premier League (Landsbankadeild) in 2008 where she was named to the mid-season Top Eleven and named the Best Foreign Player and Best Goalkeeper by the league. She then moved to Kristianstads DFF of the Swedish Women's Premier League (Damallsvenskan) in 2009. Maron signed with the Atlanta Beat of Women's Professional Soccer on February 9, 2010. In 2011, she played for magicJack. As Anna Felicitas Sarholz was injured and couldn't play for the second half of the season in the German Bundesliga, Turbine Potsdam signed Maron in January 2012 for the rest of the season. She and Potsdam however ended her contract mutually when the Women's Professional Soccer folded and goalkeeper Alyssa Naeher returned to Potsdam. Maron instead signed for Valur in Iceland's Úrvalsdeild. Following the end of the season she returned to Kristiantads DFF three years later.

== Education ==
Maron received her bachelor's degree in Anthropology and Sociology from Fairfield University in 2008. During her senior year, inspired by 2006 Nobel Peace Prize recipient Muhammad Yunus and the Grameen Bank, Maron and eight other Fairfield students started "Sustainable Equity for Women", a micro-lending project designed to raise and invest money in small businesses run by women in developing countries in conjunction with Kiva Microfunds.
