= TJ Neubauer =

American lacrosse player

Personal information
- Born: Glen Arm, Maryland, U.S.

Sport
- Position: Midfielder
- NCAA team: Fairfield University (2013–2016)
- MLL draft: 34th overall, 2016; Rochester Rattlers
- MLL teams: Rochester Rattlers (2017)

TJ Neubauer (born in Glen Arm, Maryland) is a professional lacrosse player with the Rochester Rattlers of Major League Lacrosse. He was a 2016 USILA All-America while playing for Fairfield University.

== High school ==
Neubauer attended Loyola Blakefield High School in Baltimore, Maryland where he earned three varsity letters. He earned US Lacrosse All-America accolades after his junior season. During his senior season he served as team captain while earning the Dons Coaches Award for Most Outstanding Player and All-Kudda Team honor.

== College ==
Neubauer graduated from Fairfield University where he ranks third in program history with 109 goals and tenth with 122 points. As a senior captain, Neubauer was named an USILA All-America Honorable Mention, USILA North/South All-Star, First Team All-NEILA, and First Team All-CAA.

== Professional ==
Neubauer was the 34th selection of the 2016 MLL Collegiate Draft by the Rochester Rattlers.
