= Brent Adams =

American lacrosse player (born 1990)

Personal information
- Nationality: American
- Born: December 8, 1990 (age 35)
- Height: 6 ft 1 in (185 cm)
- Weight: 180 lb (82 kg; 12 st 12 lb)

Sport
- Position: Midfield (field), Forward (Box)
- Shoots: Right
- NCAA team: Fairfield University (2012)
- NLL team Former teams: New York Riptide; Colorado Mammoth
- MLL teams: Chesapeake Bayhawks; Boston Cannons; Denver Outlaws
- PLL team Former teams: Atlas Lacrosse Club; Redwoods Lacrosse Club

Brent Adams (born October 2, 1990 in Norwalk, Connecticut) is a professional lacrosse player for the Atlas Lacrosse Club of the Premier Lacrosse League and the New York Riptide of the National Lacrosse League. Adams was an All-American midfielder at Fairfield University and played for the United States men's national lacrosse team.

== College ==
Adams attended Fairfield University where he was a 2012 All-American selection and two time All-ECAC First Team selection following the 2011 and 2012 seasons. During his career, Adams started 40 of 53 games, recorded 100 points (68 goals, 32 assists), collected 92 ground balls and forced 27 turnovers.

== Professional ==
Adams was the 53rd pick of the 2012 Major League Lacrosse Collegiate Draft by the Chesapeake Bayhawks. During the 2012 MLL season, he was a member of the Chesapeake Bayhawks team that won the Steinfeld Cup and the MLL Championship.

Adams subsequently was acquired by the Boston Cannons on Sept 23, 2012 in a trade with the Chesapeake Bayhawks. As a member of the Boston Cannons, he was selected twice to play in the 2015 MLL All-Star Game in Houston, Texas and the 2016 MLL All-Star Game in Fullerton, California.

After the 2016 MLL season, Adams engaged in the new MLL Player Movement Policy and signed with the Denver Outlaws.

Adams also signed a two-year free agent agreement with the Colorado Mammoth of the National Lacrosse League on September 15, 2016.

On October 22, 2018 it was announced that Adams was joining the Premier Lacrosse League for the summer 2019 season. On March 4, 2019 it was announced that Adams was joining the Redwoods Lacrosse Club. In 5 appearances this season, Adams has 6 goals, 1 assist, 6 ground balls and 1 caused turnover.

On August 3, 2020, Adams signed a one-year contract with the New York Riptide in NLL.

Adams was selected by Cannons Lacrosse Club in the 2021 PLL Expansion Draft, however, he would be traded by Cannons to Atlas in exchange for a fourth round pick in the 2022 College Draft less than three weeks later.

== Team USA ==
Adams was selected to play for the United States men's national lacrosse team in an exhibition game September 11, 2016 as part of the US Lacrosse Grand Opening celebration weekend.

== Career stats ==
=== MLL ===
Season	Team	Regular season											Playoffs										
Season	Team	GP	G	2PG	A	Pts	Sh	GB	Pen	PIM	FOW	FOA	GP	G	2PG	A	Pts	Sh	GB	Pen	PIM	FOW	FOA
2012	Chesapeake Bayhawks	6	1	0	1	2	11	7	0	0.5	0	0	1	0	0	0	0	0	0	0	0	0	0
2013	Boston Cannons	12	4	0	1	5	12	7	0	2.5	0	0	–	–	–	–	–	–	–	–	–	–	–
2014	Boston Cannons	14	15	1	1	17	43	18	0	3	0	0	–	–	–	–	–	–	–	–	–	–	–
2015	Boston Cannons	14	17	1	6	24	54	29	0	1.5	0	0	1	1	0	0	1	4	0	0	0	0	0
2016	Boston Cannons	14	20	1	9	30	80	37	0	1.5	0	0	–	–	–	–	–	–	–	–	–	–	–
		60	57	3	18	78	200	98	0	9	0	0	2	1	0	0	1	4	0	0	0	0	0
Career total:		62	58	3	18	79	204	98	0	9	0	0											

GP–Games played; G–Goals; 2PG–2-point goals; A–Assists; Pts–Points; Sh–Shots; GB–Ground balls; Pen–Penalties; PIM–Penalty minutes; FOW–Faceoffs won; FOA–Faceoffs attempted

=== NLL ===
Brent Adams		Regular season									Playoffs								
Season	Team	GP	G	A	Pts	LB	PIM	Pts/GP	LB/GP	PIM/GP	GP	G	A	Pts	LB	PIM	Pts/GP	LB/GP	PIM/GP
2017	Colorado Mammoth	8	7	7	14	18	0	1.75	2.25	0.00	–	–	–	–	–	–	–	–	–
2019	Colorado Mammoth	5	3	1	4	19	0	0.80	3.80	0.00	–	–	–	–	–	–	–	–	–
		13	10	8	18	37	0	1.38	2.85	0.00	0	0	0	0	0	0	0.00	0.00	0.00
Career Total:		13	10	8	18	37	0	1.38	2.85	0.00									

GP–Games played; G–Goals; A–Assists; Pts–Points; LB–Loose balls; PIM–Penalty minutes; Pts/GP–Points per games played; LB/GP–Loose balls per games played; PIM/GP–Penalty minutes per games played.

=== PLL ===
Season	Team	Regular season											Playoffs										
Season	Team	GP	G	2PG	A	Pts	Sh	GB	Pen	PIM	FOW	FOA	GP	G	2PG	A	Pts	Sh	GB	Pen	PIM	FOW	FOA
2019	Redwoods	10	10	0	1	11	35	11	0	0	0	0	3	3	1	2	6	9	3	1	1	0	0
2020	Redwoods	6	5	0	1	6	30	12	0	0	0	0	–	–	–	–	–	–	–	–	–	–	–
2021	Atlas	6	1	0	3	4	11	14	0	0	0	0	–	–	–	–	–	–	–	–	–	–	–
		22	16	0	5	21	76	37	0	0	0	0	3	3	1	2	6	9	3	1	1	0	0
Career total:		25	19	1	7	27	85	40	1	1	0	0											

GP–Games played; G–Goals; 2PG–2-point goals; A–Assists; Pts–Points; Sh–Shots; GB–Ground balls; Pen–Penalties; PIM–Penalty minutes; FOW–Faceoffs won; FOA–Faceoffs attempted
