= Drew Adams =

American lacrosse player (born 1986)

Personal information
- Nationality: American
- Born: August 19, 1986 (age 39) Springfield, Pennsylvania, U.S.
- Height: 6 ft 2 in (188 cm)
- Weight: 205 lb (93 kg; 14 st 9 lb)

Sport
- Position: Goaltender
- MLL teams: Long Island/New York Lizards
- PLL teams: Archers Lacrosse Club
- NCAA team: Penn State
- Pro career: 2009–2021

Drew Adams (born August 19, 1986 in Springfield, Pennsylvania) is an American former professional lacrosse goaltender who played for the Utah Archers of the Premier Lacrosse League and the Long Island/New York Lizards of Major League Lacrosse. Adams played collegiately at Penn State University, where he was named an All American three times. Adams ranks first in PSU history with 694 career saves.

Adams has enjoyed a successful career in Major League Lacrosse, winning his first championship in 2015. He has been an MLL All- Star 4 times, and has been named the leagues Goalie of the Year following the 2011, 2012, and 2015 seasons.

On the International level, Adams is a current member of Team USA, winning a silver medal in the 2014 World Games.

Adams announced his retirement following the 2021 PLL season, finishing his career as the all-time leader in saves in professional outdoor lacrosse.

== See also ==
- Lacrosse in Pennsylvania
