= Timothy Conway (executive) =

American businessman

Timothy J. Conway
- Education: Fairfield University B.A. University of Connecticut, MBA
- Years active: 2004
- Employer: NewStar Financial
- Title: CEO

Timothy "Tim" J. Conway is an American businessman and the founder and former chairman and CEO of NewStar Financial.

== Career ==
Conway founded NewStar Financial in June 2004 and has been its Chairman, Chief Executive Officer and President from September 2006 until 2020. From 1996 to 2002, Conway managed Corporate Finance and Capital Markets for FleetBoston Financial. Prior to joining Fleet, Tim spent 10 years as a Managing Director at Citicorp in New York. He worked as an Investment Director at Aetna and was responsible for the purchase and management of privately placed debt securities.

== Education ==
Conway received his bachelor's degree from Fairfield University in 1976 and MBA from the University of Connecticut.

== Personal life ==
Conway and wife, Kathyrn, live in Boston, Massachusetts. He is a member of the board of trustees at Fairfield University. Conway Field at Rafferty Stadium on the campus of Fairfield University is named in recognition of Conway's contributions to the University. He serves as a director of Citizen School in addition to US Squash.
