= Jack Near =

American lacrosse player (born 1992)

Personal information
- Nationality: American
- Born: October 26, 1992 (age 34) Bronxville, New York, U.S.
- Height: 6 ft 3 in (191 cm)
- Weight: 175 lb (79 kg; 12 st 7 lb)

Sport
- Position: Midfielder
- Shoots: Right
- MLL team: Dallas Rattlers
- NCAA team: Notre Dame Fighting Irish

Jack Near (born October 26, 1992, in Bronxville, New York) is lacrosse player for the Dallas Rattlers in Major League Lacrosse. Near currently starts as a defensive midfielder for Dallas. Near was announced as signing with the Premier Lacrosse League.

== High school career ==
At Bronxville High School, Jack played for the Varsity Lacrosse team for 4 years. Jack was a standout all-around midfielder, although he was recruited for his skills on defense.

		Regular Season
Season	Team	GP	G	A	Pts
2008	Bronxville	4	4	4	8
2009	Bronxville	18	45	15	60
2010	Bronxville	19	41	18	59
2011	Bronxville	23	59	24	83
High School Totals		64	149	61	210

== College career ==
At Notre Dame Near played as a short stick defensive midfielder where he appeared in 48 games gathering 19 points.

		Regular Season
Season	Team	GP	G	A	Pts
2012	Notre Dame	16	1	0	1
2013	Notre Dame	14	2	1	3
2014	Notre Dame	18	9	6	15
College totals		48	12	42	142

== Professional MLL career ==
Near was selected with the 7th pick of the first round by the Rochester Rattlers in the 2015 Major League Lacrosse Collegiate Draft. In his rookie season Near played in 5 regular season games and managed to score 3 goals. During the playoffs Near played in 2 games and scored a single goal in the Rattlers run to the championship. Near moved with the team to Dallas. In 2018 he appeared in 12 games and picked up 5 goals, 1 2pt goal, 2 assist, and 12 ground balls.
