= Steve Dusseau =

American lacrosse player

- Born: July 28, 1980 (age 44)
- Nationality: American
- Height: 5 ft 10 in (1.78 m)
- Weight: 200 pounds (91 kg)
- Shoots: Right
- Position: Midfield
- NLL draft: 12th overall, 2002; Columbus Landsharks
- MLL team: Boston Cannons
- NCAA team: Georgetown University
- Pro career: 2002–

Steve Dusseau (born July 28, 1980) was an All-American lacrosse player for Georgetown University, where he was a two-time All-American and won the 2002 USILA National Player of the Year award. He led the Hoyas to NCAA Men's Lacrosse Championship appearances in 2001 and 2002. He played his high school lacrosse for Upper Arlington High School in Columbus, Ohio, where he was also an All-American.

In 2002, Dusseau was drafted by the Major League Lacrosse's Boston Cannons with the second pick in the 1st round of the 2002 MLL Collegiate Draft. Steve was selected to the 2003 MLL All Stars team

Dusseau was inducted into the Ohio Lacrosse Hall of Fame in 2018. On February 9, 2024, he was enshrined in the Georgetown University Athletic Hall of Fame.

== Statistics ==
=== Major League Lacrosse ===
		Regular Season				Playoffs
Season	Team	GP	G	A	Pts	GP	G	A	Pts
2002	Boston	6	10	4	14	1	2	--	2
2003	Boston	10	18	5	23	1	2	--	2
2004	Boston	11	21	1	22	2	4	--	4
2005	Boston	5	3	--	--	--	--	--	--
2006	Chicago	8	6	4	10	--	--	--	--
MLL Totals		40	58	14	72	4	8	--	8

=== Georgetown University ===
Season	GP	G	A	Pts	PPG
1999	--	13	8	21	--
2000	--	26	7	33	--
2001	14	38	10	48	--
2002	15	53	15	68	4.60
Totals	--	130	40	170	--

== Awards ==
Preceded by Doug Shanahan	USILA National Player of the Year; 2002	Succeeded by Tillman Johnson
