= Andrew Copelan =

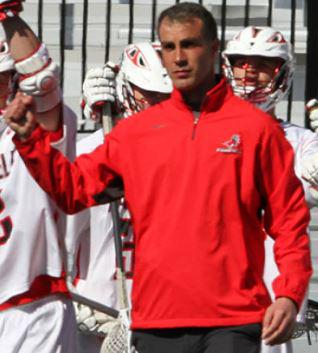

Current position
- Title: Head coach
- Team: Waterdogs Lacrosse Club
- Record: 1- 3 (.000)

Biographical details
- Born: Pittsford, New York, U.S.
- Education: Bucknell University

Playing career
- 1999–2003: Bucknell
- Position: Midfielder

Coaching career (HC unless noted)
- 2004-2005: Marist
- 2006-2008: Maryland (asst.)
- 2008–2019: Fairfield

Head coaching record
- Overall: 91 - 64 (.587)

Accomplishments and honors

Awards
- All-Patriot League (’03); MAAC Coach of the Year (’04); CAA Coach of the Year ('15)

Andrew "Andy" Copelan (born in Pittsford, New York) is the head coach of the Waterdogs Lacrosse Club. Previously, Copelan was the head coach of Fairfield University from 2008 to 2019. Prior to that, Copelan was an assistant coach and offensive coordinator at the Maryland Terrapins from 2006 to 2008. He was the head coach at Marist College from 2004 to 2005, where he led the Red Foxes to their first NCAA tournament appearance in 2005.

Copelan is a 2003 graduate of Bucknell University. Copelan was a four-year starter at midfielder, where he helped lead the Bison to four consecutive Patriot League titles, and the program's first-ever NCAA berth in 2001. As a senior, he earned All-Patriot League accolades, and was a four-time selection to the Patriot League Academic Honor Roll for Student Athletes. He was also chosen as an alternate for the annual North-South game, a national senior all-star game.

== Head coaching record ==
Record table
Season	Team	Overall	Conference	Standing	Postseason
Marist (Metro Atlantic Athletic Conference) (2004–2005)
2004–2005	Marist	8-8	5-3	4th	NCAA 1st Round
Marist:		8-8	5-3		
Fairfield (ECAC Lacrosse League) (2008–2014)
2008–2009	Fairfield	7-6	4-3	3rd	
2009–2010	Fairfield	8-6	4-3	3rd	
2010–2011	Fairfield	8-8	3-3	3rd	
2011–2012	Fairfield	12-4	4-2	3rd	
2012–2013	Fairfield	8-7	4-3	3rd	
2013–2014	Fairfield	12-4	3-1	1st	
Fairfield (Colonial Athletic Association) (2015–2019)
2014–2015	Fairfield	9-6	4-1	1st	
2015–2016	Fairfield	9-8	4-1	1st	
2016–2017	Fairfield	5-9	2-3	5th	
2017–2018	Fairfield	4-11	1-4	5th (t)	
2018–2019	Fairfield	5-9	0-5	6th	
Fairfield:		87-78	33-29		
Total:		95-86			
National champion Postseason invitational champion Conference regular season champion Conference regular season and conference tournament champion Division regular season champion Division regular season and conference tournament champion Conference tournament champion
