= Joe Marra =

American lacrosse player

Personal information
- Nationality: American
- Born: December 12, 1987 (age 38) Smithtown, New York, U.S.
- Height: 6 ft 2 in (188 cm)
- Weight: 225 lb (102 kg; 16 st 1 lb)

Sport
- Position: Goalie
- MLL team Former teams: Charlotte Hounds; Chicago MachineHamilton Nationals
- NCAA team: Fairfield University
- Pro career: 2011–

Joe Marra (born December 12, 1987, in Smithtown, New York) is a professional lacrosse player with the Hamilton Nationals of Major League Lacrosse. Marra was selected to participate in the 2011 MLL All-Star Games. Marra also in the 2012 season helped the Hauppauge High School Eagles lacrosse team by being the goalie coach

== Professional career ==
Marra was selected in the seventh round (37th overall) in the 2010 Major League Lacrosse Collegiate Draft by the Chicago Machine. Marra made his professional debut on May 19, 2011, against PPoP Pirates

== Collegiate career ==
Marra attended Fairfield University where he started all 14 games in net for the Stags in 2010 and finished with a career-best 150 saves, the 10th most in a single-season in Fairfield program history. His .597 save percentage on the year ranked him second in the nation and his 7.90 goals-against average ranked him fifth in the nation. Marra was a First Team All-ECAC Selection and was selected to play in the NEILA North-South Game.

== High school career ==
Marra attended Smithtown High School where he was named a 2005 High School All-American and Inside Lacrosee Young Gun.
