= Greg Downing =

American lacrosse player

Personal information
- Born: March 24, 1985 (age 41) Auburn, New York, U.S.
- Height: 6 ft 1 in (185 cm)

Sport
- Position: Midfielder
- NCAA team: Fairfield University (2007)
- NLL draft: 43rd overall, 2007; Boston Blazers
- NLL teams: Colorado Mammoth (2018); New England Black Wolves (2019)
- MLL draft: 6th overall, 2007; Los Angeles Riptide
- MLL teams: Los Angeles Riptide (2007–2008); Denver Outlaws (2009); Boston Cannons (2009–2011); Denver Outlaws (2017–2017)
- National team: United States (2011–2019)
- Pro career: 2004–2019

Greg "GD" Downing (born March 24, 1985, in Auburn, New York) is an American professional lacrosse player with the Denver Outlaws of Major League Lacrosse and with the Toronto Rock of the National Lacrosse League. He was selected to participate in the 2008 and 2009 MLL All-Star Games.

== College ==
Downing attended Fairfield University, where he was a three-time All-American. In 2005, Downing helped lead the Stags to the Great Western Lacrosse League Championship and the NCAA Men's Lacrosse Championship Tournament. Also in 2006 and 2007, he was selected for the Tewaaraton Trophy Preseason Watchlist, given to the nation's most outstanding NCAA lacrosse player. During his college career Downing produced 141 points, on 101 goals and 40 assists. Downing was clocked shooting the ball 109 mph in practice.

Season	GP	G	A	Pts	PPG
2004	14	23	10	33	2.36
2005	16	32	14	46	2.88
2006	11	26	9	35	3.19
2007	12	20	7	27	2.25
Totals	53	101	40	141	2.66

== Professional ==
Downing was drafted in the 1st round (6th overall) of the 2007 Major League Lacrosse Collegiate Draft by the Los Angeles Riptide. Downing was also selected in the 4th round (43rd overall) in the 2007 National Lacrosse League expansion draft by the Boston Blazers. As a member of the Los Angeles Riptide, Downing was selected to play in the 2008 MLL All-Star Game, and as a member of the Denver Outlaws he was selected to play in the 2009 MLL All-Star Game. Downing won the 2011 MLL championship with the Boston Cannons and the 2016 MLL Championship with the Denver Outlaws. On March 14, 2018, Downing retired from the MLL.

== Team USA ==
Downing was one of 18 players named to the United States men's national lacrosse team by U.S. Indoor Lacrosse and participated at the 2011 World Indoor Lacrosse Championship in Prague, Czech Republic, in May 2011, where he won the bronze medal. At the 2015 World Indoor Lacrosse Championship, hosted by the Onondaga nation, Downing was again a member of the team, and again won the bronze medal. In 2019, Downing was named to the team again.
