= Peter Vlahakis =

American lacrosse player

Personal information
- Nationality: American
- Born: January 20, 1982 (age 43) Shoreham, New York, U.S.
- Height: 5 ft 10 in (178 cm)
- Weight: 185 lb (84 kg; 13 st 3 lb)

Sport
- Position: Midfield/Faceoff
- MLL team Former teams: Long Island Lizards; New Jersey Pride
- NCAA team: Fairfield University
- Pro career: 2004–

Peter Vlahakis (born January 20, 1982, in Shoreham, New York) is a professional lacrosse player with the Long Island Lizards of Major League Lacrosse (MLL) and the holder of four MLL All-Time face-off records. Vlahakis broke the MLL career face-off wins record with 1054 & finished #2 in career face-off percentage. He still holds the single game face-off wins (35) record and record for being a 4 time defensive player of the week in a single season. He was selected to participate in the 2007 and 2008 MLL All-Star Game.

== Professional career ==
Vlahakis was drafted in the 4th round of the 2004 Major League Lacrosse Collegiate Draft by the New Jersey Pride. On July 3, 2008, Vlahakis set the league record for face off wins by winning 35 in a single game.

== College career ==
Vlahakis attended Fairfield University, where he won 620 faceoffs, which was the 4th highest in NCAA history. Vlahakis was a two-time All-New England selection and pre-season All-American in 2002.

== Personal ==
Peter's father is Bob Vlahakis, the producer and innovator of the annual Face-Off Yearbook covering college lacrosse since 1994 and a current Senior Editor of the Inside Lacrosse Magazine.
