= Great Western Lacrosse League =

The Great Western Lacrosse League, also known as the GWLL, was an NCAA Division I men's college lacrosse athletic conference that existed from 1994 to 2009. The conference was created when the NCAA instituted automatic qualifiers to the NCAA championship tournament; in so doing, it eliminated the "western region" bid.

The GWLL ceased operations in 2010, as a result of Notre Dame's 2008 decision to leave the conference for the newly established Big East lacrosse conference in 2010; the remaining GWLL schools, including the Air Force Academy, University of Denver, The Ohio State University, Quinnipiac University, and Bellarmine University, joined the ECAC, as a five-team GWLL would no longer have been eligible to receive an automatic bid to the NCAA championship tournament under the rule requiring conferences to have at least six members to qualify for the bid.

== History ==
The GWLL was established in 1994. The original members were Air Force, Butler, Denver, Michigan State, Notre Dame, and Ohio State. Just prior to the 1997 season, Michigan State left the conference after the school dropped varsity lacrosse, leaving the league with five clubs. The NCAA requires a conference to have six members in order to be eligible for an automatic qualifier to the NCAA tournament. As a result, Fairfield was added as a sixth member. Fairfield later left the conference to join the ECAC and was replaced by Quinnipiac. Later, Butler left the GWLL when its athletic department dropped several sports programs including men's lacrosse in January 2007. Bellarmine was added to the conference in 2007 after the school began competing in Division I men's lacrosse in 2005.

In 2008, the GWLL held its first championship tournament. Previously, the GWLL champion was determined by regular-season results. Notre Dame won the championship with a 9-2 victory over Ohio State, earning an automatic bid to the 2008 NCAA Division I Men's Lacrosse Championship. In addition to Notre Dame's automatic bid, Ohio State and Denver also received "at-large" bids to the NCAA tournament, giving the GWLL three teams in the tournament. The following year, in 2009, Notre Dame again won the GWLL championship, defeating Ohio State 16-7 in the conference's last tournament.

== Former members ==
| Institution | Nickname | Location | Head coach | Field | Current Lacrosse League |
|---|---|---|---|---|---|
| United States Air Force Academy | Falcons | Colorado Springs, CO | Eric Seremet | Cadet Lacrosse Stadium | ASUN Conference |
| Bellarmine University | Knights | Louisville, KY | Kevin Burns | Owsley B. Frazier Stadium | ASUN Conference |
| Butler University | Bulldogs | Indianapolis, IN | | | Central Collegiate Lacrosse Association (MCLA) |
| University of Denver | Pioneers | Denver, CO | Bill Tierney | Peter Barton Lacrosse Stadium | Big East Conference |
| Fairfield University | Stags | Fairfield, CT | John Odierna | Lessing Field | Colonial Athletic Association |
| Michigan State University | Spartans | East Lansing, MI | | | Central Collegiate Lacrosse Association (MCLA) |
| University of Notre Dame | Fighting Irish | South Bend, IN | Kevin Corrigan | Arlotta Stadium | Atlantic Coast Conference |
| Ohio State University | Buckeyes | Columbus, OH | Nick Myers | Jesse Owens Memorial Stadium | Big Ten Conference |
| Quinnipiac University | Bobcats | Hamden, CT | Eric Fekete | QU Lacrosse Field | Metro Atlantic Athletic Conference |

== Champions ==
=== Regular season champions ===
| Year | Champion(s) | Conference | Overall |
|---|---|---|---|
| 2009 | Notre Dame | 5–0 | 12–0 |
| 2008 | Denver; Notre Dame; Ohio State | 4–1; 4–1; 4–1 | 10–7; 14–3; 11–6 |
| 2007 | Notre Dame | 5–0 | 11–3 |
| 2006 | Denver | 5–0 | 12–5 |
| 2005 | Denver; Fairfield | 4–1; 4–1 | 9–5; 11–5 |
| 2004 | Ohio State | 5–0 | 12–4 |
| 2003 | Denver; Notre Dame; Ohio State | 4–1; 4–1; 4–1 | 9–5; 9–5; 9–5 |
| 2002 | Fairfield; Notre Dame | 4–1; 4–1 | 7–6; 5–8 |
| 2001 | Notre Dame | 5–0 | 14–2 |
| 2000 | Notre Dame | 5–0 | 10–4 |
| 1999 | Butler; Notre Dame | | |
| 1998 | Ohio State | | |
| 1997 | Notre Dame | | |
| 1996 | Notre Dame | | |
| 1995 | Notre Dame | | |
| 1994 | Notre Dame | | |

=== Playoff champions ===
| Year | Champion | Title game opponent | Score |
|---|---|---|---|
| 2009 | Notre Dame | Ohio State | 16-7 |
| 2008 | Notre Dame | Ohio State | 9-2 |

== Annual awards ==
Player of the Year

| Year | Player | Team |
|---|---|---|
| 2008 | Kevin Buchanan | Ohio State University |
| 2009 | Scott Rodgers | University of Notre Dame |

Newcomer of the Year

| Year | Player | Team |
|---|---|---|
| 2006 | Joel Dalgarno | Ohio State University |
| 2008 | Jamie Lincoln | University of Denver |
| 2009 | Dayton Gilbreath | Air Force Academy |

Coach of the Year

| Year | Player | Team |
|---|---|---|
| 2004 | Joe Breschi | Ohio State University |
| 2005 | Ted Spencer | Fairfield University |
| 2008 | Eric Fekete | Quinnipiac University |
| 2009 | Kevin Corrigan | University of Notre Dame |

All Great Western Lacrosse League Honors: 2005

| Class | Position | Name | Team | Honors |
|---|---|---|---|---|
| Senior | Attack | Matt Brown | University of Denver | First Team |
| Freshman | Attack | Will Meister | United States Air Force Academy | First Team |
| Freshman | Attack | Pat Walsh | University of Notre Dame | First Team |
| Sophomore | Midfielder | Scott Davidson | University of Denver | First Team |
| Sophomore | Midfield | Justin Kuchta | United States Air Force Academy | First Team |
| Sophomore | Midfield | Justin Kuchta | United States Air Force Academy | First Team |
| Senior | Midfielder | Tom Randisi | Ohio State University | First Team |
| Senior | Defender | Christian Anderson | University of Denver | First Team |
| Junior | Defender | Steve Forsythe | Butler University | First Team |
| Junior | Defender | DJ Driscoll | University of Notre Dame | First Team |
| Junior | Goalie | Justin Pavoni | United States Air Force Academy | First Team |

All Great Western Lacrosse League Honors: 2006

| Class | Position | Name | Team | Honors |
|---|---|---|---|---|
| Sophomore | Attack | Kevin Buchanan | Ohio State University | First Team |
| Sophomore | Defender | Brian Yontz | Ohio State University | First Team |
| Sophomore | Long Stick Midfielder | Ricky Pages | Ohio State University | First Team |
| Senior | Goalie | Justin Pavoni | United States Air Force Academy | First Team |
| Sophomore | Goalie | Joey Kemp | University of Notre Dame | First Team |
