= 2005 NCAA Division I men's lacrosse tournament =

- Dates: May 14–30, 2005
- Teams: 16
- Finals site: Lincoln Financial Field; Philadelphia, Pennsylvania
- Champions: Johns Hopkins (8th title)
- Runner-up: Duke (1st title game)
- Semifinalists: Maryland (18th Final Four); Virginia (17th Final Four)
- Winning coach: Dave Pietramala (1st title)
- MOP: Jesse Schwartzman, Johns Hopkins
- Attendance: 45,275 semi-finals 44,920 finals 90,195 total
- Top scorer: Matt Danowski, Duke (21 goals)

The 2005 NCAA Division I lacrosse tournament was the 35th annual tournament hosted by the National Collegiate Athletic Association to determine the team champion of men's college lacrosse among its Division I programs, held at the end of the 2005 NCAA Division I men's lacrosse season.

Johns Hopkins won the championship with a 9–8 win over Duke. The Blue Jays, led by senior Kyle Harrison and sophomore goalie Jesse Schwartzman, won their eighth NCAA championship and first since 1987. All the while, Johns Hopkins allowed just one goal the entire second half of the game. Schwartzman was named the tournament's outstanding player.

In an exciting national semi-final game, Hopkins won against Virginia in overtime on a goal by defensive short stick midfielder Benson Erwin. Virginia seemingly had the game locked up in regulation after scoring the go ahead goal with 12.9 seconds remaining. But Hopkins won the ensuing face off and raced down the field tying the game with 1.5 seconds to go, setting up Erwin's overtime heroics.

The championship game was played at Lincoln Financial Field in Philadelphia, Pennsylvania, with an audience of 44,920 fans, the 4th highest total for an NCAA lacrosse final.

== Qualifying ==
Sixteen NCAA Division I college men's lacrosse teams met after having played their way through a regular season, and for some, a conference tournament.

Marist made their debut appearance in the Division I men's lacrosse tournament.

== Bracket ==
First Round; May 14–15, 2005
1	Johns Hopkins	22
Marist	6
Syracuse	15
8	Massachusetts	16
5	Navy	9
Delaware	7
Albany	9
4	Virginia	23
3	Maryland	14
Penn State	10
Army	6
6	Georgetown	16
7	Towson	11
Cornell	12
Fairfield	4
2	Duke	23

Quarterfinals; May 21–22, 2005
1	Johns Hopkins	19
8	Massachusetts	9
5	Navy	8
4	Virginia	10
3	Maryland	9
6	Georgetown	8
Cornell	8
2	Duke	11

Semifinals; May 28, 2005
1	Johns Hopkins	9*
4	Virginia	8
3	Maryland	9
2	Duke	18

Final; May 30, 2005
1	Johns Hopkins	9
2	Duke	8

- * = Overtime

== See also ==
- 2005 NCAA Division I women's lacrosse tournament
- 2005 NCAA Division II men's lacrosse tournament
- 2005 NCAA Division III men's lacrosse tournament
