= Telemedicine service providers =

This list of telemedicine services providers is for notable telemedicine, telehealth, and mobile health providers and services. This includes virtual care facilities for remote care, services or platforms used for specific steps within the healthcare industry, and clinical navigation.

== Software platforms connecting patients with healthcare providers ==
- Accurx - Established in 2016. A British software company that provides messaging services for doctors to communicate with patients via text.
- American Well - Established in 2006. Formerly known as American Well, a telemedicine company that connects patients with doctors over a secure video platform.
- Doxy.me - Established in 2013. A simple and free telemedicine app that facilitates HIPAA compliant video calls. Founded by PhD student at the University of Utah.
- Nowpatient - Established in 1999. A British software providing online pharmacy and telehealth services.
- Vetster - Established in 2020. A Canadian telemedicine marketplace that enables veterinary providers to offer services to pet owners and their pets.
- Vsee - Established in 2008. A proprietary real-time video communication platform. Founded by PhD student at Stanford University.
- LifeMD - is a publicly traded American telehealth company. It gives subscribers access to doctors and nurse practitioners for virtual medical consultations and treatments with prescription medications.
- Qoves - Estbablished in 2019. Providing facial analyses.

== Teledentistry ==
- SmileDirectClub - Established in 2014. A teledentistry company that provides teeth straightening services.

== Virtual care facilities ==
- Amazon Clinic - Established in 2022. One of Amazon's forays into healthcare.
- Cerebral - Established in 2020. American telehealth company that provides online mental health services, including therapy, counseling, and medication management for various mental health conditions.
- Mercy Virtual - Established in 2015. A virtual care center that operates solely through the use of telemedicine.
- Teladoc Health - Established in 2002. A telemedicine and virtual healthcare company based in the United States that facilitates virtual visits between patients and doctors.

== Miscellaneous ==
- Doctoralia - A Spanish online healthcare platform for booking appointments and online consultations.
- Hims & Hers Health - Established in 2017. An American telehealth company that sells prescription and over-the-counter drugs online (especially those that treat erectile dysfunction and hair loss), as well as personal care products.
- Phreesia - Established in 2005. A software-as-a-service company that provides patient intake management.
- Your.MD - A digital healthtech company that uses AI to provide users with health information via a chatbot.
- Zocdoc - Established in 2007. An online medical care appointment booking service and medical care search facility.
