= Florian Kemmerich =

German entrepreneur (born 1969)

Founder of Vocating.ai
- In office 2026–present

Managing Partner at Bamboo Capital Partners
- In office 2016–2024

President of Olympus Biotech International
- In office 2011–2014

Personal details
- Born: Andreas Florian Kemmerich; 26 August 1969 (age 57) Black Forest, Germany
- Education: Dual University in Villingen-Schwenningen; GSBA Zurich; University of Wales; State University of New York
- Occupation: Business executive and Impact investor

Andreas Florian Kemmerich commonly referred to as Florian Kemmerich (born 26 August 1969), is a Geneva-based German entrepreneur, impact investor, and former Judoka. He is the co-founder of Human Planet, a global impact advisory firm established in 2025. He previously held president positions at medical companies, Small Bone Innovations (now Stryker) and Olympus Biotech International. Since 2016, he has focused on impact investing, serving as Managing Partner at Bamboo Capital Partners and later at KOIS Advisory.

Born in the Black Forest region of southern Germany, Kemmerich was a competitive judoka in his youth, he won a bronze medal at the German U21 Championships in 1989. He has served on boards of numerous organizations including Bboxx, Seedstars, Goodwall, ForAfrika, and Amazonia Impact Ventures among others. He is also the author of the book On Vocation: How to Align Your Purpose with Your Profession.

== Biography ==
Kemmerich was born on 26 August 1969 in the Black Forest region of southern Germany. In his youth he trained in judo, competing nationally for Germany. He also served as a paratrooper.

Kemmerich holds a Bachelor of Business Administration from Dual University in Villingen-Schwenningen in 1994 and did a Master of Science in Marketing at GSBA Zurich, University of Wales and State University of New York, graduating in 2002.

=== Judo career ===
Kemmerich began practicing Judo during his childhood. Encouraged by his parents to learn self-defense, he trained in a local judo club and later pursued the sport competitively. He went on to compete in the Judo Bundesliga and represented the national team in international competitions.

During his judo career, Kemmerich attained a 3rd dan grade. He won a bronze medal at the German Championships U21 Karlsruhe in 1989 in the category U86.

== Career ==
In 1994, Kemmerich joined B. Braun, he eventually held various executive roles, living in Germany, Mexico, and other regions of Europe and Latin America until 2008. He was subsequently appointed president of Small Bone Innovations (now Stryker) in the United States, serving until 2011. Kemmerich then served as president of the Ireland-based Olympus Corporation subsidiary, Olympus Biotech International until 2014.

In 2016, Kemmerich joined Bamboo Capital Partners, a Geneva-based impact fund manager, as Managing Partner. In May 2023, Palladium Group appointed him Managing Director of Palladium Impact Capital, while he retained his role at Bamboo.

In 2024, Kemmerich became Managing Partner at KOIS Advisory, the global consulting arm of KOIS Impact Group. In May 2025, MzN International made a Management Buy-Out of the KOIS Advisory to launch Human Planet. He is also the Founder & Chief Vocating Officer at Vocating.ai, a Geneva-based agentic-AI for Good platform founded in 2026.

Since 2007, Kemmerich is a member of the Young Presidents' Organization (YPO), he held leadership roles including chairing the YPO Impact Networks Council, co-founding the YPO Planet Action Network in 2019 and YPO North Star Chapter in 2020. Since July 2025, he chairs the TIGER 21 organization in Switzerland.

== Publications ==
- 2025: On vocation: how to align your purpose with your profession. Routledge. ISBN 978-1-041-06728-3
