= Troxel =

Troxel is a surname. Notable people with the surname include:

- Andrea Troxel, American biostatistician
- Ed Troxel (1925–2001), American football coach
- Gary Troxel, American singer, member of The Fleetwoods
- Melanie Troxel, American drag racer

== See also ==
- Troxell
