= Outpatient department =

Hospital departments for treating the non-admitted

An outpatient department (OPD) or outpatient clinic is the part of a hospital designed for the treatment of outpatients, people with health problems who visit the hospital for diagnosis or treatment, but do not at this time require a bed or to be admitted for overnight care. Modern outpatient departments offer a wide range of treatment services, diagnostic tests and minor surgical procedures.

== Department ==
Outpatient department of a hospital provides diagnosis and care for patients that do not need to stay overnight. The departments are also sometimes called outpatient clinics, but are distinct from clinics independent of hospitals, almost all of which are designed mostly or exclusively for outpatient care and may be also be called outpatient clinics.

The outpatient department is an important part of the overall running of the hospital. It is normally integrated with the in-patient services and staffed by consultant physicians and surgeons who also attend inpatients in the wards (OPD). Many patients are examined and given treatment as outpatients before being admitted to the hospital at a later date as inpatients. When discharged, they may attend the outpatient clinic for follow-up treatment.

The outpatient department will usually be on the ground floor of the hospital with car-parking facilities nearby. Wheelchairs and stretchers are available for non-ambulatory patients. Patients will register at a reception desk and there is seating for them while they wait for their appointments. Each doctor will have a consulting room and there may be smaller waiting areas near these. Paediatric clinics are often held in areas separated from the adult clinics. Close at hand will be X-ray facilities, laboratories, the medical record office and a pharmacy. In the main waiting area there are a range of facilities for the patients and their families including toilets, public telephones, coffee shop or snack bar, water dispenser, gift shop, florist and quiet room.

Not all hospitals have separate outpatient departments, so outpatients may be treated in the same departments as patients that stay overnight.

== Reform ==
The Royal College of Physicians said that UK outpatient clinics were stuck "in the 18th Century" and an expensive waste of time and money. There were 127 million appointments in 2017 and about 20% of them were cancelled or the patient did not turn up. 57% of them ran late. They wanted more use of remote monitoring, telephone and video consultations and senior nurses running clinics closer to people's homes. The NHS Long Term Plan proposed that up to a third of face-to-face outpatient appointments should be done by video link by 2024. The COVID-19 pandemic in England spurred radical shifts to video appointments as most routine appointments were cancelled. The Attend Anywhere digital healthcare service was installed across NHS organisations in England in March 2020 with backing from NHSX and by May 2020 had been used for more than 79,000 consultations.

Sir Jim Mackey is leading a drive in 2022 to increase the number of patient-initiated follow-up appointments, where patients "take ownership of their care," arranging follow-up appointments and diagnostics themselves and reducing the number of "pointless reviews". He wants patients to be offered virtual consultations elsewhere in the country if there is a long wait at their local hospital. An NHS England review in August 2022 reported that the number of patients moved or discharged to PIFU pathways across the 34 providers monitored increased from 53,000 to 118,000 in the nine months up to May 2022. This was an increase from 0.7% to 1.5% in the overall proportion of total outpatient appointments across those trusts.

Jacob Haddad, the co-founder of AccuRx, argues that much more should be done to empower patients. He says that "NHS providers should use PIFU to open a digital channel of communication which allows patients to get the specialist support or advice they need, without needing to book an appointment at all if it's not needed."

== Payment ==
NHS England proposed changes to payment systems in 2018 aimed at reducing the number of consultant-led appointments and incentivising hospitals to conduct more appointments remotely.
