= Doxy =

Doxy may refer to

- An archaic English term for prostitute
- Doxy (song), a jazz standard by Sonny Rollins
- Doxy, a magical creature in the fictional Harry Potter universe
- Doxy.me a simple and free telemedicine software for healthcare professionals
- Doxycycline, an antibiotic drug
- Doxylamine, an antihistamine drug
- An abbreviation for Doxygen, a software package
- Doxy (vibrator), a British-made wand vibrator

== See also ==
- Doxey, a village and civil parish in Staffordshire, England
