= Kyle Sweeney =

American professional lacrosse player (born 1981)

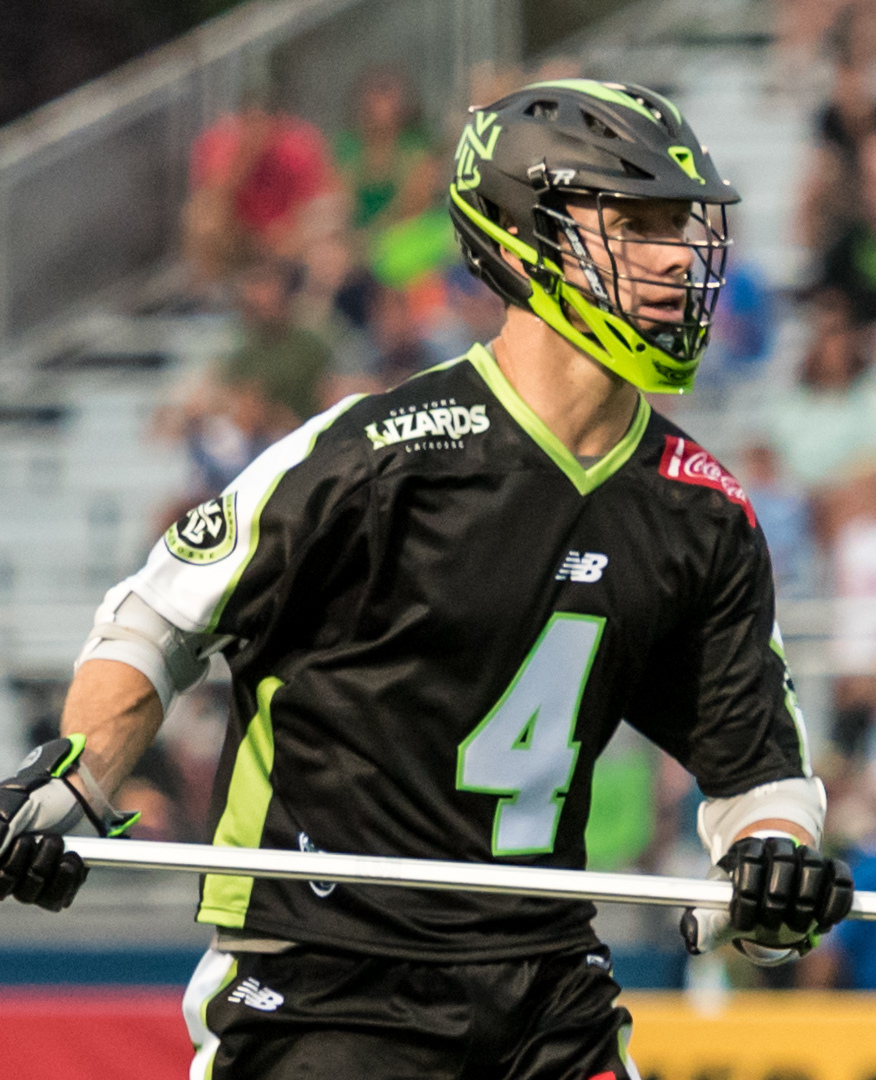

Personal information
- Born: April 5, 1981 (age 45) Springfield, Pennsylvania, U.S.
- Height: 6 ft 2 in (188 cm)
- Weight: 195 lb (88 kg; 13 st 13 lb)

Sport
- Position: Defense
- Shoots: Right
- NCAA team: Georgetown (2003)
- NLL draft: 83rd Overall, 2003; Philadelphia Wings
- NLL team Former teams: New England Black Wolves; Philadelphia Wings; Edmonton Rush; Buffalo Bandits
- MLL draft: 3rd Round, 2003; Bridgeport Barrage
- MLL team Former teams: New York Lizards; Chesapeake Bayhawks; Boston Cannons; Washington Bayhawks; Philadelphia Barrage; Bridgeport Barrage
- Pro career: 2003–2016

Career highlights
- 4× MLL Champion (2004, 2006, 2007, 2011)
Medal record
Representing United States
Men's lacrosse
World Lacrosse Championship
Silver medal – second place	2006 London
Gold medal – first place	2010 Manchester
World Indoor Lacrosse Championship
Bronze medal – third place	2007 Halifax

Kyle Sweeney (born April 5, 1981, in Springfield, Pennsylvania) is an American professional lacrosse player who plays for the New York Lizards in Major League Lacrosse. He is the vice president of sports nutrition at Medifast, and co-founder of the Gotham Lacrosse League.

Sweeney played for the U.S. Men's National Team in the 2006 and 2010 World Lacrosse Championship, and played for Team USA in the 2007 World Indoor Lacrosse Championship.

== Personal ==
Sweeney is a native of Springfield, Pennsylvania. He is from an athletic family: both his father, Jack, and mother, Denise, are gym teachers, and his brother was an All American athlete in high school. He began playing lacrosse in middle school for the Springfield Athletic Association, and moved on to the Springfield Cougars Lacrosse Club in high school, where he received All-American honors and was the All-Central League MVP. He also played football and basketball.

Sweeney married Angela Lanzafama in 2011.

== Collegiate career ==
Sweeney attended Georgetown University's McDonough School of Business, where he was a three-time All-American long-stick midfielder. As a freshman, he was awarded the 2000 ECAC Rookie of the Year. He was also named Two-time ECAC Defensive Player of the Year in 2002 and 2001, and was named to the All-ECAC First Team three times. He served as co-captain of the 2003 Georgetown Hoyas men's lacrosse team. Sweeney set the Georgetown all-time record of 229 ground balls while in college. Academically, he was a double major in international business and marketing as well as minor concentration in sociology.

Sweeney was inducted into the National Lacrosse Hall of Fame in 2023.

== Professional lacrosse career ==
=== Major League Lacrosse ===
Sweeney was selected by the Bridgeport Barrage in the 2003 Collegiate Draft, Round 3. He followed the team when it moved from Bridgeport, Connecticut, to Philadelphia, Pennsylvania, in 2003. Sweeney anchored the defensive unit that helped the Barrage win the MLL championship in 2004, 2006 and 2007. When the team folded in 2008, Sweeney moved to Washington Bayhawks for one game, then over to the Boston Cannons, which he led to win the 2011 MLL Championships. In 2014 he moved back to the Bayhawks, which relocated in Chesapeake. In 2017, he began playing for the New York Lizards.

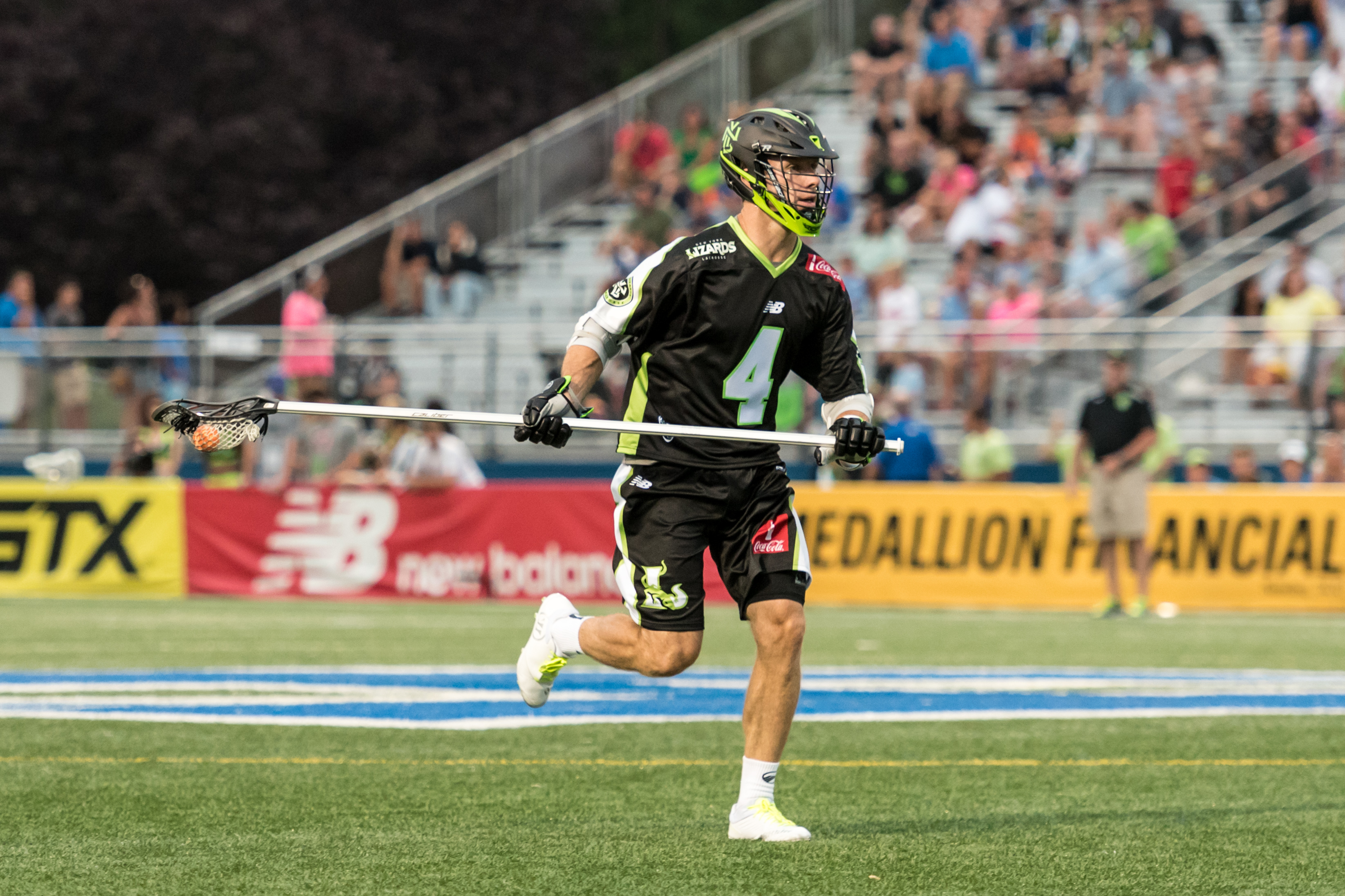
Sweeney playing for New York Lizards

Sweeney has been selected to the MLL All-Star Game nine times, been named All-MLL three times, and has won the Steinfeld Cup four times. He is currently ranked third for all-time games played in the league, as well as eighth for all-time ground balls fielded.

After a fifteen-year career, Sweeney announced his retirement from Major League Lacrosse on August 31, 2017.

=== National League Lacrosse ===
The Philadelphia Wings drafted Sweeney in the eighth round (83rd overall) of the 2003 NLL Entry Draft. He followed the team when it moved to Connecticut, changing its name to the New England Black Wolves. He retired from indoor play in 2015.

=== International career ===
Sweeney played for the U.S. Men's National Team in the 2006 and 2010. In 2010, his team won the World Lacrosse Championship in Manchester. He also played for Team USA in the 2007 World Indoor Lacrosse Championship.

Sweeney has been described as one of the "best defenders in the game, period", by Inside Lacrosse, which placed him no. 24 on their Top 50 list in 2009.

== Business career ==
Sweeney was the chief operating officer for Maverick Lacrosse, a New York-based lacrosse equipment manufacturer, from 2005 to 2010. He then moved to Performance Sports Group, where he worked as Vice president of operations and product development until 2013, when he became vice president of marketing and business planning. He left in 2016 to become vice president of sports nutrition at Medifast.

Sweeney co-founded the Gotham Lacrosse League, an elite men's summer league in New York City, with Billy Pymm in 2007. The league expanded to include an elite women's league in 2013.

== Statistics ==
=== Major League Lacrosse (MLL) ===
		Regular Season							Playoffs
Season	Team	GP	G	2ptG	A	Pts	GB	PIM	GP	G	2ptG	A	Pts	GB	PIM
2003	Bridgeport	5	0	0	1	1	15	1	-	-	-	-	-	-	-
2004	Philadelphia	12	2	0	1	3	47	4	-	-	-	-	-	-	-
2005	Philadelphia	12	1	0	2	3	44	1	-	-	-	-	-	-	-
2006	Philadelphia	11	1	0	0	1	32	3	2	1	0	0	1	2	0
2007	Philadelphia	12	5	0	2	7	29	0	2	1	0	0	1	5	0
2008	Philadelphia	11	5	0	4	9	47	1	1	0	0	0	0	1	0
2009	Washington	1	0	0	0	0	3	3	-	-	-	-	-	-	-
2009	Boston	11	9	0	4	13	57	3	1	0	0	0	0	1	0
2010	Boston	10	5	0	1	4	36	1	1	0	0	1	1	3	0
2011	Boston	9	2	0	2	4	21	2	2	0	0	1	1	4	0
2012	Boston	14	3	0	5	8	32	3	1	1	0	0	1	2	0
2013	Boston	14	4	0	3	7	35	1	-	-	-	-	-	-	-
2014	Boston	13	3	0	0	3	25	1	-	-	-	-	-	-	-
2015	Chesapeake	13	1	0	0	1	22	2	-	-	-	-	-	-	-
2016	Chesapeake	8	0	0	1	1	22	1	-	-	-	-	-	-	-
2016	New York	5	0	0	0	0	18	.5	-	-	-	-	-	-	-
MLL Totals		161	41	0	26	65	485	36.5	10	3	0	2	5	18	0

=== National League Lacrosse (NLL) ===
		Regular Season						Playoffs
Season	Team	GP	G	A	Pts	LB	PIM	GP	G	A	Pts	LB	PIM
2005	Philadelphia	12	1	6	7	53	11	-	-	-	-	-	-
2006	Philadelphia	15	4	9	13	91	8	-	-	-	-	-	-
2007	Philadelphia	16	4	7	11	85	6	-	-	-	-	-	-
2008	Philadelphia	16	5	20	25	127	4	1	0	1	1	3	0
2009	Philadelphia	16	7	18	25	130	6	-	-	-	-	-	-
2010	Philadelphia	15	4	6	10	90	4	-	-	-	-	-	-
2011	Edmonton	6	1	7	8	24	2	-	-	-	-	-	-
2011	Philadelphia	9	2	0	2	43	0	-	-	-	-	-	-
2012	Buffalo	5	0	2	2	20	4	-	-	-	-	-	-
2013	Philadelphia	9	2	5	7	37	4	1	0	1	1	0	0
2014	Philadelphia	18	2	12	14	53	18	-	-	-	-	-	-
NLL totals		180	32	92	124	753	67	2	0	2	2	3	0

=== NCAA ===
Season	Team	GP	G	A	Pts	GB
2000	Georgetown	14	2	4	6	61
2001	Georgetown	15	0	0	0	60
2002	Georgetown	15	5	4	9	75
2003	Georgetown	11	0	1	1	33
NCAA Totals		55	7	9	16	229

== See also ==
- Lacrosse in Pennsylvania
