= Cerebral =

Cerebral may refer to:

- Of or relating to the brain
- Cerebral (company), an American telehealth company that provides online mental health services
- Cerebrum, the largest and uppermost part of the brain
- Cerebral cortex, the outer layer of the cerebrum
- Retroflex consonant, also referred to as a cerebral consonant, a type of consonant sound used in some languages
- Intellectual, rather than emotional
