= Social networking service =

Online platform used to build relations

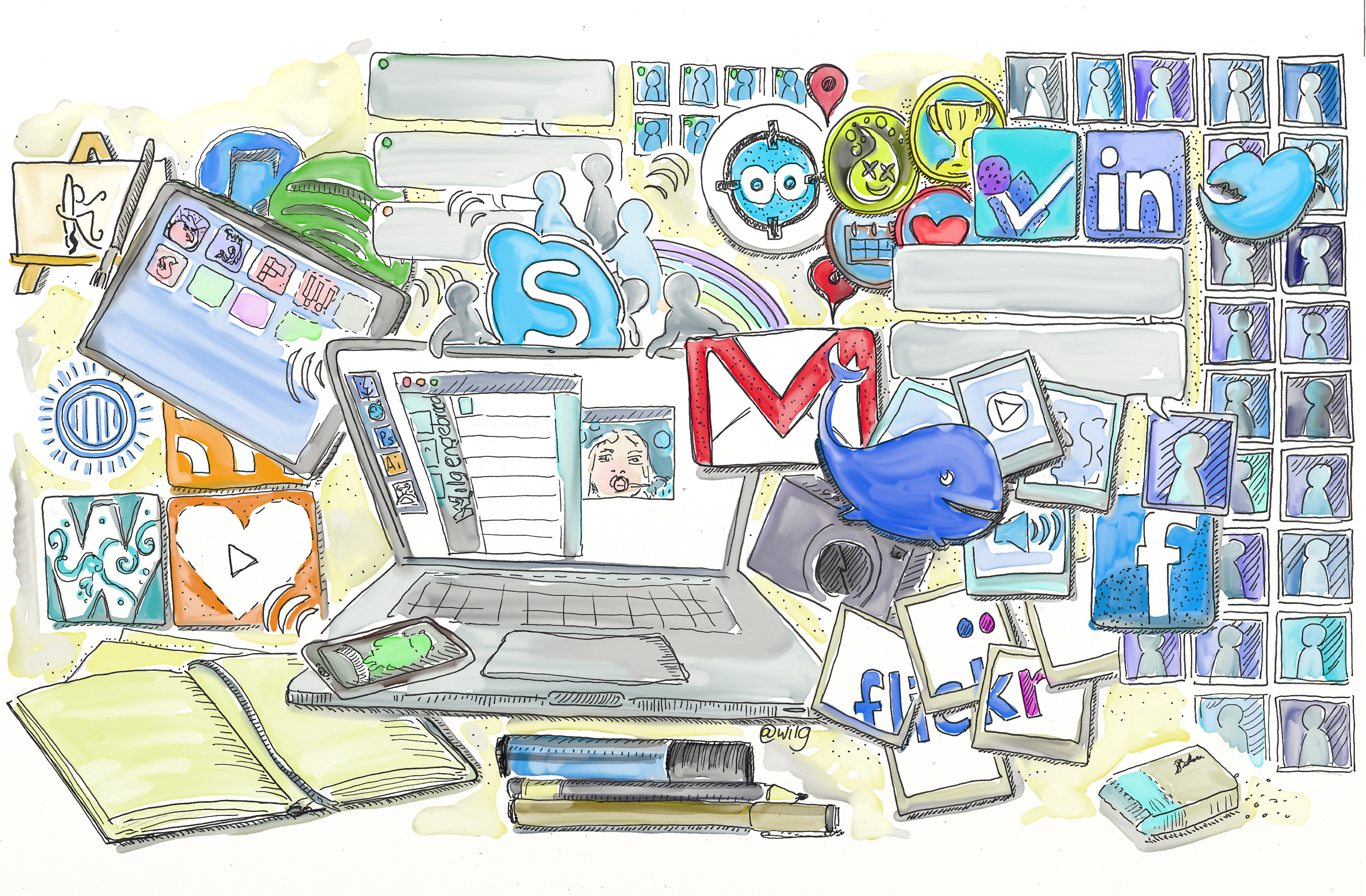
Illustrations showing various icons of some popular social networking services

A social networking service or social networking site, abbreviated as SNS, is a type of online social media platform which people use to build social networks or social relationships with other people who share similar personal or career content, interests, activities, backgrounds or real-life connections.

Social networking services vary in format and the number of features. They can incorporate a range of new information and communication tools, operating on desktops and on laptops, on mobile devices such as tablet computers and smartphones. This may feature digital photo/video/sharing and diary entries online (blogging). Online community services are sometimes considered social-network services by developers and users, though in a broader sense, a social-network service usually provides an individual-centered service whereas online community services are groups centered. Generally defined as "websites that facilitate the building of a network of contacts in order to exchange various types of content online," social networking sites provide a space for interaction to continue beyond in-person interactions. These computer mediated interactions link members of various networks and may help to create, sustain and develop new social and professional relationships.

Social networking sites allow users to share ideas, digital photos and videos, posts, and to inform others about online or real-world activities and events with people within their social network. While in-person social networking – such as gathering in a village market to talk about events – has existed since the earliest development of towns, the web enables people to connect with others who live in different locations across the globe (dependent on access to an Internet connection to do so).

Depending on the platform, members may be able to contact any other member. In other cases, members can contact anyone they have a connection to, and subsequently anyone that contact has a connection to, and so on.

Facebook has a massive 2.13 billion active monthly users and an average of 1.4 billion daily active users as of 2017.

LinkedIn, a career-oriented social-networking service, generally requires that a member personally know another member in real life before they contact them online. Some services require members to have a preexisting connection to contact other members.

After the COVID-19 pandemic, Zoom, a videoconferencing platform, took an integral place to connect people located around the world and facilitate many online environments such as school, university, work and government meetings.

The main types of social networking services contain category places (such as age or occupation or religion), means to connect with friends (usually with self-description pages), and a recommendation system linked to trust. One can categorize social-network services into four types:

- socialization social network services used primarily for socializing with existing friends or users (e.g., Facebook, Instagram, Twitter/X)
- online social networks are decentralized and distributed computer networks where users communicate with each other through Internet services.
- networking social network services used primarily for non-social interpersonal communication (e.g., LinkedIn, a career- and employment-oriented site)
- social navigation social network services used primarily for helping users to find specific information or resources (e.g., Goodreads for books, Reddit)

There have been attempts to standardize these services to avoid the need to duplicate entries of friends and interests (see the FOAF standard). A study reveals that India recorded world's largest growth in terms of social media users in 2013. A 2013 survey found that 73% of U.S. adults use social-networking sites.

== Offline and online social networking services ==
Differences between offline and online social networking services
Characteristic	Offline social network	Online social network
Degree centrality	While the number of cognitively manageable ties is limited to about 150, most people report having 14–56 ties at average	Huge number of ties technologically possible, but average number is limited, e.g., Facebook: 395
Symmetry	Usually symmetric (reciprocal behavior)	Symmetric (e.g., Instagram, LinkedIn, XING) and asymmetric (e.g., Twitter, now X)
Affect	Positive (92–97%) and negative (3–8%) tie relationships can be managed using high sophisticated coordination mechanisms such as argumentation and negotiation	Except through blocking (e.g., Twitter) or hiding (e.g., Facebook) limited support to deal with negative tie relationships
Strength	2–8 strong ties and 12–48 weak/latent ties on average	9–37 strong ties and 68–131 weak/latent ties on average
Dynamic of change	Low due to manual interaction	High because of technological support

== History ==
The potential for computer networking to facilitate newly improved forms of computer-mediated social interaction was suggested early on. Efforts to support social networks via computer-mediated communication were made in many early online services, including Usenet, ARPANET, LISTSERV, and bulletin board services (BBS). Many prototypical features of social networking sites were also present in online services such as The Source, Delphi, America Online, Prodigy, CompuServe, and The WELL.

Early social networking on the World Wide Web began in the form of generalized online communities such as Theglobe.com (1995), GeoCities (1994) and Tripod.com (1995). Many of these early communities focused on bringing people together to interact with each other through chat rooms and encouraged users to share personal information and ideas via personal web pages by providing easy-to-use publishing tools and free or inexpensive web space. Some communities – such as Classmates.com – took a different approach by simply having people link to each other via email addresses. PlanetAll started in 1996.

In the late 1990s, user profiles became a central feature of social networking sites, allowing users to compile lists of "friends" and search for other users with similar interests. New social networking methods were developed by the end of the 1990s, and many sites began to develop more advanced features for users to find and manage friends. Open Diary, a community for online diarists, invented both friends-only content and the reader comment, two features of social networks important to user interaction.

This newer generation of social networking sites began to flourish with the emergence of SixDegrees in 1997, Open Diary in 1998, Mixi in 1999, Makeoutclub in 2000, Cyworld in 2001, Hub Culture in 2002, and Friendster and Nexopia in 2003. Cyworld also became one of the first companies to profit from the sale of virtual goods. MySpace and LinkedIn were launched in 2003, and Bebo was launched in 2005. Orkut became the first popular social networking service in Brazil (although most of its very first users were from the United States) and quickly grew in popularity in India (Madhavan, 2007). There was a rapid increase in social networking sites' popularity; in 2005, MySpace had more pageviews than Google. Many of these services were displaced by Facebook, which launched in 2004 and became the largest social networking site in the world in 2009.

=== Social media ===
The term social media was first used in 2004 and is often used to describe social networking services.

== Social impact ==
Web-based social networking services make it possible to connect people who share interests and activities across political, economic, and geographic borders. Through e-mail and instant messaging, online communities are created where a gift economy and reciprocal altruism are encouraged through cooperation. Information is suited to a gift economy, as information is a nonrival good and can be gifted at practically no cost. Scholars have noted that the term "social" cannot account for technological features of the social network platforms alone. Hence, the level of network sociability should determine by the actual performances of its users. According to the communication theory of uses and gratifications, an increasing number of individuals are looking to the Internet and social media to fulfill cognitive, affective, personal integrative, social integrative, and tension free needs. With Internet technology as a supplement to fulfill needs, it is in turn affecting everyday life, including relationships, school, church, entertainment, and family. Companies are using social media as a way to learn about potential employees' personalities and behavior. In numerous situations, a candidate who might otherwise have been hired has been rejected due to offensive or otherwise unseemly photos or comments posted to social networks or appearing on a newsfeed.

Facebook and other social networking tools are increasingly the aims of scholarly research. Scholars in many fields have begun to investigate the impact of social networking sites, investigating how such sites may play into issues of identity, politics, privacy, social capital, youth culture, and education. Research has also suggested that individuals add offline friends on Facebook to maintain contact and often this blurs the lines between work and home lives. Users from around the world also utilise social networking sites as an alternative news source. While social networking sites have arguably changed how we access the news, users tend to have mixed opinions about the reliability of content accessed through these sites.

According to a study in 2015, 63% of the users of Facebook or Twitter in the USA consider these networks to be their main source of news, with entertainment news being the most seen. In the times of breaking news, Twitter users are more likely to stay invested in the story. In some cases when the news story is more political, users may be more likely to voice their opinion on a linked Facebook story with a comment or like, while Twitter users will just follow the site's feed and retweet the article. In online social networks, the veracity and reliability of news may be diminished due to the absence of traditional media gatekeepers.

A 2015 study shows that 85% of people aged 18 to 34 use social networking sites for their purchase decision making. While over 65% of people aged 55 and over-rely on word of mouth. Several websites are beginning to tap into the power of the social networking model for philanthropy. Such models provide a means for connecting otherwise fragmented industries and small organizations without the resources to reach a broader audience with interested users. Social networks are providing a different way for individuals to communicate digitally. These communities of hypertexts allow for the sharing of information and ideas, an old concept placed in a digital environment. In 2011, HCL Technologies conducted research that showed that 50% of British employers had banned the use of social networking sites/services during office hours.

Research has provided us with mixed results as to whether or not a person's involvement in social networking can affect their feelings of loneliness. Studies have indicated that how a person chooses to use social networking can change their feelings of loneliness in either a negative or positive way. Some companies with mobile workers have encouraged their workers to use social networking to feel connected. Educators are using social networking to stay connected with their students whereas individuals use it to stay connected with their close relationships.

Social networking sites can be used by consumers to create a social media firestorm, which is "A digital artifact created by large numbers of user comments of multiple purposes (condemnation and support) and tones (aggressive and cordial) that appear rapidly and recede shortly after."

Each social networking user is able to create a community that centers around a personal identity they choose to create online. In his book Digital Identities: Creating and Communicating the Online Self, Rob Cover argues that social networking's foundation in Web 2.0, high-speed networking shifts online representation to one which is both visual and relational to other people, complexifying the identity process for younger people and creating new forms of anxiety. A 2016 University of Pittsburgh study found a correlation between social media use and depression among U.S. adults between the ages of 19 and 32. At least one study went as far as to conclude that the negative effects of Facebook usage are equal to or greater than the positive effects of face-to-face interactions.

According to a recent article from Computers in Human Behavior, Facebook has also been shown to lead to issues of social comparison. Users are able to select which photos and status updates to post, allowing them to portray their lives in acclamatory manners. These updates can lead to other users feeling like their lives are inferior by comparison. Users may feel especially inclined to compare themselves to other users with whom they share similar characteristics or lifestyles, leading to a fairer comparison. Motives for these comparisons can be associated with the goals of improving oneself by looking at profiles of people who one feels are superior, especially when their lifestyle is similar and possible. One can also self-compare to make oneself feel superior to others by looking at the profiles of users who one believes to be worse off. However, a study by the Harvard Business Review shows that these goals often lead to negative consequences, as use of Facebook has been linked with lower levels of well-being; mental health has been shown to decrease due to the use of Facebook. Computers in Human Behavior emphasizes that these feelings of poor mental health have been suggested to cause people to take time off from their Facebook accounts; this action is called "Facebook Fatigue" and has been common in recent years.

Usage of social networking has contributed to a new form of abusive communication, and academic research has highlighted a number of social-technological explanations for this behaviour. These including the anonymity afforded by interpersonal communications, factors that include boredom or attention seeking, or the result of more polarised online debate. The impact in this abuse has found impacts through the prevalence of online cyberbullying, and online trolling. There has also been a marked increase in political violence and abuse through social media platforms. For instance, one study by Ward and McLoughlin found that 2.57% of all messages sent to UK MPs on Twitter were found to contain abusive messages.

== Features ==
=== Typical features ===
According to boyd and Ellison's 2007 article, "Why Youth (Heart) Social Network Sites: The Role of Networked Publics in Teenage Social Life", social networking sites share a variety of technical features that allow individuals to: construct a public/semi-public profile, articulate a list of other users that they share a connection with, and view their list of connections within the system. The most basic of these are visible profiles with a list of "friends" who are also users of the site. In an article entitled "Social Network Sites: Definition, History, and Scholarship," boyd and Ellison adopt Sunden's (2003) description of profiles as unique pages where one can "type oneself into being". A profile is generated from answers to questions, such as age, location, interests, etc. Some sites allow users to upload pictures, add multimedia content or modify the look and feel of the profile. Others, e.g., Facebook, allow users to enhance their profile by adding modules or "Applications". Many sites allow users to post blog entries, search for others with similar interests and compile and share lists of contacts. User profiles often have a section dedicated to comments from friends and other users. To protect user privacy, social networks typically have controls that allow users to choose who can view their profile, contact them, add them to their list of contacts, and so on.

=== Additional features ===
There is a trend towards more interoperability between social networks led by technologies such as OpenID and OpenSocial. In most mobile communities, mobile phone users can now create their own profiles, make friends, participate in chat rooms, create chat rooms, hold private conversations, share photos and videos, and share blogs by using their mobile phone. Some companies provide wireless services that allow their customers to build their own mobile community and brand it; one of the most popular wireless services for social networking in North America and Nepal is Facebook Mobile. Recently, Twitter has also introduced fact check labels to combat misinformation which was primarily spread due to the coronavirus but also has had an impact on debunking false claims by Donald Trump in the 2020 election.

Social media platforms may allow users to change their user name (or "handle", distinct from the "display name"), which could change the URL to their profile. Users are advised to do so with caution, since it could break back links from others' posts and comments depending on implementation, and external back links.

== Emerging trends ==
The things you share are things that make you look good, things which you are happy to tie into your identity.

— Hilary Mason, chief data scientist, bitly, VentureBeat, 2012

While the popularity of social networking consistently rises, new uses for the technology are frequently being observed. Today's technologically savvy population requires convenient solutions to their daily needs. At the forefront of emerging trends in social networking sites is the concept of "real-time web" and "location-based". Real-time allows users to contribute contents, which is then broadcast as it is being uploaded—the concept is analogous to live radio and television broadcasts. Twitter set the trend for "real-time" services, wherein users can broadcast to the world what they are doing, or what is on their minds within a 140-character limit. Facebook followed suit with their "Live Feed" where users' activities are streamed as soon as it happens. While Twitter focuses on words, Clixtr, another real-time service, focuses on group photo sharing wherein users can update their photo streams with photos while at an event. Facebook, however, remains the largest photo sharing site with over 250 bi as of September aliabbas 2013. In April 2012, the image-based social media network Pinterest had become the third largest social network in the United States.

Companies have begun to merge business technologies and solutions, such as cloud computing, with social networking concepts. Instead of connecting individuals based on social interest, companies are developing interactive communities that connect individuals based on shared business needs or experiences. Many provide specialized networking tools and applications that can be accessed via their websites, such as LinkedIn. Others companies, such as Monster.com, have been steadily developing a more "socialized" feel to their career center sites to harness some of the power of social networking sites. These more business related sites have their own nomenclature for the most part but the most common naming conventions are "Vocational Networking Sites" or "Vocational Media Networks", with the former more closely tied to individual networking relationships based on social networking principles.

Foursquare gained popularity as it allowed for users to check into places that they are frequenting at that moment. Gowalla is another such service that functions in much the same way that Foursquare does, leveraging the GPS in phones to create a location-based user experience. Clixtr, though in the real-time space, is also a location-based social networking site, since events created by users are automatically geotagged, and users can view events occurring nearby through the Clixtr iPhone app. Recently, Yelp announced its entrance into the location-based social networking space through check-ins with their mobile app; whether or not this becomes detrimental to Foursquare or Gowalla is yet to be seen, as it is still considered a new space in the Internet technology industry.

One popular use for this new technology is social networking between businesses. Companies have found that social networking sites such as Facebook and Twitter are great ways to build their brand image. According to Jody Nimetz, author of Marketing Jive, there are five major uses for businesses and social media: to create brand awareness, as an online reputation management tool, for recruiting, to learn about new technologies and competitors, and as a lead generation tool to intercept potential prospects. These companies are able to drive traffic to their own online sites while encouraging their consumers and clients to have discussions on how to improve or change products or services. As of September 2013, 71% of online adults use Facebook, 17% use Instagram, 21% use Pinterest, and 22% use LinkedIn.

=== Science ===
One other use that is being discussed is the use of social networks in the science communities. Julia Porter Liebeskind et al. have published a study on how new biotechnology firms are using social networking sites to share exchanges in scientific knowledge. They state in their study that by sharing information and knowledge with one another, they are able to "increase both their learning and their flexibility in ways that would not have been possible within a self-contained hierarchical organization". Social networking is allowing scientific groups to expand their knowledge base and share ideas, and without these new means of communicating their theories might become "isolated and irrelevant". Researchers use social networks frequently to maintain and develop professional relationships. They are interested in consolidating social ties and professional contact, keeping in touch with friends and colleagues and seeing what their own contacts are doing. This can be related to their need to keep updated on the activities and events of their friends and colleagues in order to establish collaborations on common fields of interest and knowledge sharing.

Social networks are also used to communicate scientists research results and as a public communication tool and to connect people who share the same professional interests, their benefits can vary according to the discipline. The most interesting aspects of social networks for professional purposes are their potentialities in terms of dissemination of information and the ability to reach and multiple professional contacts exponentially. Social networks like Academia.edu, LinkedIn, Facebook, and ResearchGate give the possibility to join professional groups and pages, to share papers and results, publicize events, to discuss issues and create debates. Academia.edu is extensively used by researchers, where they follow a combination of social networking and scholarly norms. ResearchGate is also widely used by researchers, especially to disseminate and discuss their publications, where it seems to attract an audience that it wider than just other scientists. The usage of ResearchGate and Academia in different academic communities has increasingly been studied in recent years.

=== Education ===
The advent of social networking platforms may also be impacting the ways in which learners engage with technology in general. For a number of years, Prensky's (2001) dichotomy between Digital Natives and Digital Immigrants has been considered a relatively accurate representation of the ease with which people of a certain age range—in particular those born before and after 1980—use technology. Prensky's theory has been largely disproved, however, and not least on account of the burgeoning popularity of social networking sites and other metaphors such as White and Le Cornu's "Visitors" and "Residents" (2011) are greater currency. The use of online social networks by school libraries is also increasingly prevalent and they are being used to communicate with potential library users, as well as extending the services provided by individual school libraries. Social networks and their educational uses are of interest to many researchers. According to Livingstone and Brake (2010), "Social networking sites, like much else on the Internet, represent a moving target for researchers and policymakers." Pew Research Center project, called Pew Internet, did a USA-wide survey in 2009 and in 2010 February published that 47% of American adults use a social networking website. Same survey found that 73% of online teenagers use SNS, which is an increase from 65% in 2008, 55% in 2006. Recent studies have shown that social network services provide opportunities within professional education, curriculum education, and learning. However, there are constraints in this area. Researches, especially in Africa, have disclosed that the use of social networks among students has been known to affect their academic life negatively. This is buttressed by the fact that their use constitutes distractions, as well as that the students tend to invest a good deal of time in the use of such technologies.

Albayrak and Yildirim (2015) examined the educational use of social networking sites. They investigated students' involvement in Facebook as a Course Management System (CMS) and the findings of their study support that Facebook as a CMS has the potential to increase student involvement in discussions and out-of-class communication among instructors and students.

==== Professional use ====
Professional use of social networking services refers to the employment of a network site to connect with other professionals within a given field of interest. These types of social networking services are referred to as "Career-oriented social networking markets (CSNM)". LinkedIn is one example and is a social networking website geared towards companies and industry professionals looking to make new business contacts or keep in touch with previous co-workers, affiliates, and clients. LinkedIn provides not only a professional social use but also encourages people to inject their personality into their profile – making it more personal than a resume. Similar websites to LinkedIn (also geared towards companies and industry professionals looking for work opportunities) to connect include AngelList, XING, Goodwall, The Dots, Jobcase, Bark.com, ... Various freelance marketplace websites (which focus on freelance work) also exist. There are also a number of other employment websites focused on international volunteering, notably VolunteerMatch, Idealist.org and All for Good. National WWOOF networks finally allow for searching for homestays on organic farms.

Now other social network sites are also being used in this manner. Twitter has become [a] mainstay for professional development as well as promotion and online SNSs support both the maintenance of existing social ties and the formation of new connections. Much of the early research on online communities assume that individuals using these systems would be connecting with others outside their preexisting social group or location, liberating them to form communities around shared interests, as opposed to shared geography. Other researchers have suggested that the professional use of network sites produce "social capital". For individuals, social capital allows a person to draw on resources from other members of the networks to which he or she belongs. These resources can take the form of useful information, personal relationships, or the capacity to organize groups. As well, networks within these services also can be established or built by joining special interest groups that others have made, or creating one and asking others to join.

==== Curriculum use ====
According to Doering, Beach, and O'Brien, a future English curriculum needs to recognize a significant shift in how adolescents are communicating with each other. Curriculum uses of social networking services can also include sharing curriculum-related resources. Educators tap into user-generated content to find and discuss curriculum-related content for students. Responding to the popularity of social networking services among many students, teachers are increasingly using social networks to supplement teaching and learning in traditional classroom environments. This way they can provide new opportunities for enriching existing curriculum through creative, authentic and flexible, non-linear learning experiences. Some social networks, such as English, baby! and LiveMocha, are explicitly education-focused and couple instructional content with an educational peer environment. The new Web 2.0 technologies built into most social networking services promote conferencing, interaction, creation, research on a global scale, enabling educators to share, remix, and repurpose curriculum resources. In short, social networking services can become research networks as well as learning networks.

==== Learning use ====
Educators and advocates of new digital literacies are confident that social networking encourages the development of transferable, technical, and social skills of value in formal and informal learning. In a formal learning environment, goals or objectives are determined by an outside department or agency. Tweeting, instant messaging, or blogging enhances student involvement. Students who would not normally participate in class are more apt to partake through social network services. Networking allows participants the opportunity for just-in-time learning and higher levels of engagement. The use of SNSs allow educators to enhance the prescribed curriculum. When learning experiences are infused into a website student utilize every day for fun, students realize that learning can and should be a part of everyday life. It does not have to be separate and unattached.

Informal learning consists of the learner setting the goals and objectives. It has been claimed that media no longer just influence human culture; they are human culture. With such a high number of users between the ages of 13 and 18, a number of skills are developed. Participants hone technical skills in choosing to navigate through social networking services. This includes elementary items such as sending an instant message or updating a status. The development of new media skills are paramount in helping youth navigate the digital world with confidence.

Social networking services foster learning through what Jenkins (2006) describes as a "participatory culture". A participatory culture consists of a space that allows engagement, sharing, mentoring, and an opportunity for social interaction. Participants of social network services avail of this opportunity. Informal learning, in the forms of participatory and social learning online, is an excellent tool for teachers to sneak in material and ideas that students will identify with and therefore, in a secondary manner, students will learn skills that would normally be taught in a formal setting in the more interesting and engaging environment of social learning. Sites like Twitter provide students with the opportunity to converse and collaborate with others in real time.

Social networking services provide a virtual "space" for learners. James Gee (2004) suggests that affinity spaces instantiate participation, collaboration, distribution, dispersion of expertise, and relatedness. Registered users share and search for knowledge which contributes to informal learning.

==== Constraints ====
In the past, social networking services were viewed as a distraction and offered no educational benefit. Blocking these social networks was a form of protection for students against wasting time, bullying, and invasions of privacy. In an educational setting, Facebook, for example, is seen by many instructors and educators as a frivolous, time-wasting distraction from schoolwork, and it is not uncommon to be banned in junior high or high school computer labs. Cyberbullying has become an issue of concern with social networking services. According to the UK Children Go Online survey of 9- to 19-year-olds, it was found that a third have received bullying comments online. To avoid this problem, many school districts/boards have blocked access to social networking services such as Facebook, MySpace, and Twitter within the school environment. Social networking services often include a lot of personal information posted publicly, and many believe that sharing personal information is a window into privacy theft. Schools have taken action to protect students from this. It is believed that this outpouring of identifiable information and the easy communication vehicle that social networking services open the door to sexual predators, cyberbullying, and cyberstalking. In contrast, however, 70% of social media using teens and 85% of adults believe that people are mostly kind to one another on social network sites.

Recent research suggests that there has been a shift in blocking the use of social networking services. In many cases, the opposite is occurring as the potential of online networking services is being realized. It has been suggested that if schools block them [social networking services], they are preventing students from learning the skills they need. Banning social networking [...] is not only inappropriate but also borderline irresponsible when it comes to providing the best educational experiences for students. Schools and school districts have the option of educating safe media usage as well as incorporating digital media into the classroom experience, thus preparing students for the literacy they will encounter in the future.

=== Positive correlates ===
A cyberpsychology research study conducted by Australian researchers demonstrated that a number of positive psychological outcomes are related to Facebook use. These researchers established that people can derive a sense of social connectedness and belongingness in the online environment. Importantly, this online social connectedness was associated with lower levels of depression and anxiety, and greater levels of subjective well-being. These findings suggest that the nature of online social networking determines the outcomes of online social network use.

=== Grassroots organizing ===
Social networks are being used by activists as a means of low-cost grassroots organizing. Extensive use of an array of social networking sites enabled organizers of 2009 National Equality March to mobilize an estimated 200,000 participants to march on Washington with a cost savings of up to 85% per participant over previous methods. The August 2011 England riots were similarly considered to have escalated and been fuelled by this type of grassroots organization.

=== Employment ===
A rise in social network use is being driven by college students using the services to network with professionals for internship and job opportunities. Many studies have been done on the effectiveness of networking online in a college setting, and one notable one is by Phipps Arabie and Yoram Wind published in Advances in Social Network Analysis. Many schools have implemented online alumni directories which serve as makeshift social networks that current and former students can turn to for career advice. However, these alumni directories tend to suffer from an oversupply of advice-seekers and an undersupply of advice providers. One new social networking service, Ask-a-peer, aims to solve this problem by enabling advice seekers to offer modest compensation to advisers for their time. LinkedIn is also another great resource. It helps alumni, students and unemployed individuals look for work. They are also able to connect with others professionally and network with companies.

In addition, employers have been found to use social network sites to screen job candidates.

=== Hosting service ===
A social network hosting service is a web hosting service that specifically hosts the user creation of web-based social networking services, alongside related applications.

=== Trade network ===
A social trade network is a service that allows participants interested in specific trade sectors to share related contents and personal opinions.

=== Business model ===
Few social networks charge money for membership. In part, this may be because social networking is a relatively new service, and the value of using them has not been firmly established in customers' minds. Companies such as Myspace and Facebook sell online advertising on their site. Their business model is based upon large membership count, and charging for membership would be counterproductive. Some believe that the deeper information that the sites have on each user will allow much better targeted advertising than any other site can currently provide. In recent times, Apple has been critical of the Google and Facebook model, in which users are defined as product and a commodity, and their data being sold for marketing revenue. Social networks operate under an autonomous business model, in which a social network's members serve dual roles as both the suppliers and the consumers of content. This is in contrast to a traditional business model, where the suppliers and consumers are distinct agents. Revenue is typically gained in the autonomous business model via advertisements, but subscription-based revenue is possible when membership and content levels are sufficiently high.

=== Social interaction ===
People use social networking sites for meeting new friends, finding old friends, or locating people who have the same problems or interests they have, called niche networking. More and more relationships and friendships are being formed online and then carried to an offline setting. Psychologist and University of Hamburg professor Erich H. Witte says that relationships which start online are much more likely to succeed. In this regard, there are studies which predict tie strength among the friends on social networking websites. One online dating site claims that 2% of all marriages begin at its site, the equivalent of 236 marriages a day. Other sites claim one in five relationships begin online.

Users do not necessarily share with others the content which is of most interest to them, but rather that which projects a good impression of themselves. While everyone agrees that social networking has had a significant impact on social interaction, there remains a substantial disagreement as to whether the nature of this impact is completely positive. A number of scholars have done research on the negative effects of Internet communication as well. These researchers have contended that this form of communication is an impoverished version of conventional face-to-face social interactions, and therefore produce negative outcomes such as loneliness and depression for users who rely on social networking entirely. By engaging solely in online communication, interactions between communities, families, and other social groups are weakened.

== Issues ==
Social networking services have led to many issues regarding privacy, bullying, social anxiety, and potential for misuse.

== Investigations ==
Social networking services are increasingly being used in legal and criminal investigations. The information posted on sites such as MySpace and Facebook has been used by police (forensic profiling), probation, and university officials to prosecute users of said sites. In some situations, content posted on MySpace has been used in court.

Facebook is increasingly being used by school administrations and law enforcement agencies as a source of evidence against student users. This site being the number one online destination for college students, allows users to create profile pages with personal details. These pages can be viewed by other registered users from the same school, which often include resident assistants and campus police who have signed up for the service. One UK police force has sifted pictures from Facebook and arrested some people who had been photographed in a public place holding a weapon such as a knife (having a weapon in a public place is illegal).

== Application domains ==
=== Government applications ===
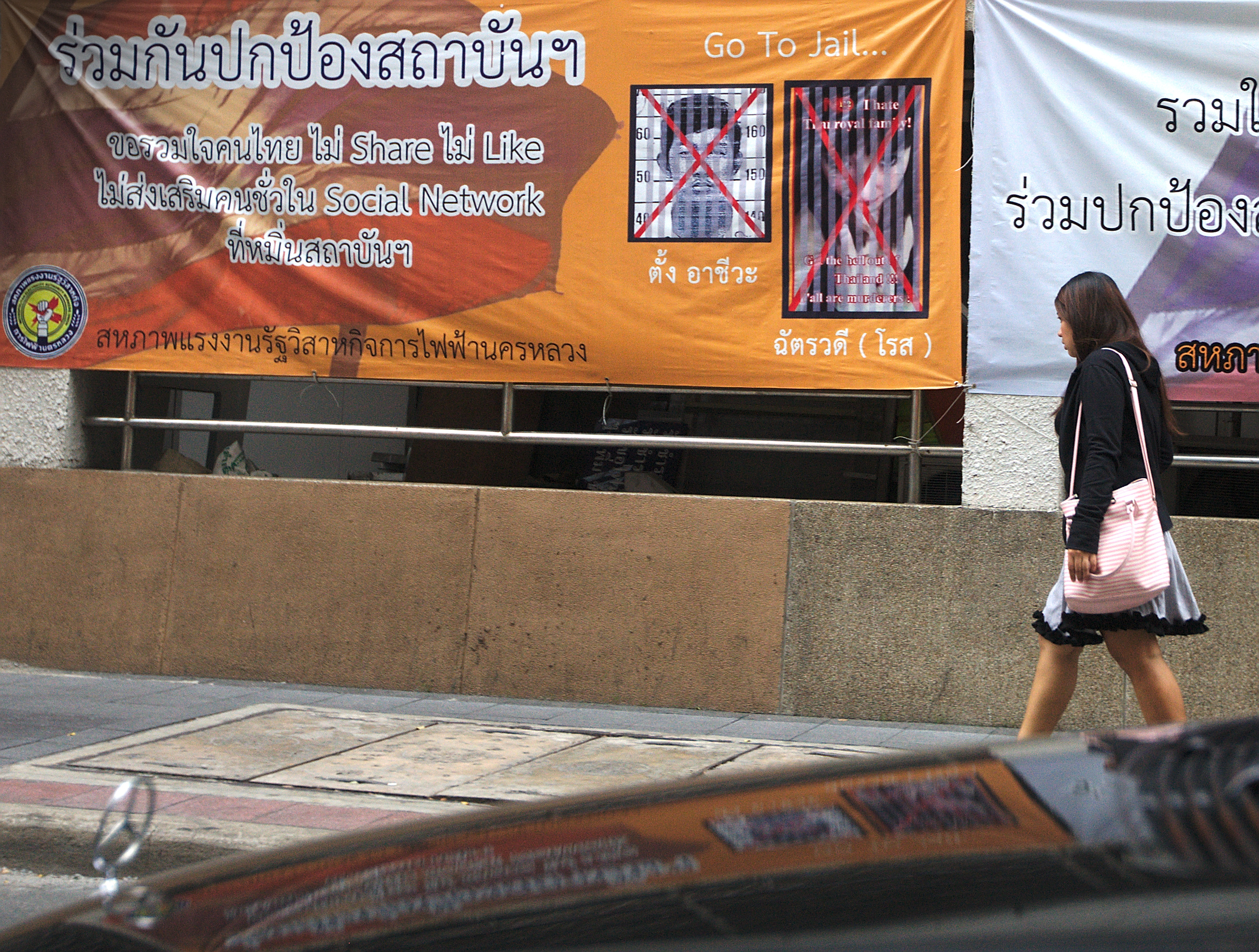
Banner in Bangkok, observed on June 30, 2014, during the 2014 Thai coup d'état, informing the Thai public that 'like' or 'share' activity on social media could land them in prison

Social networking is more recently being used by various government agencies. Social networking tools serve as a quick and easy way for the government to get the suggestion of the public and to keep the public updated on their activity, however, this comes with a significant risk of abuse, for example, to cultivate a culture of fear such as that outlined in Nineteen Eighty-Four or THX-1138.

The Centers for Disease Control demonstrated the importance of vaccinations on the popular children's site Whyville and the National Oceanic and Atmospheric Administration has a virtual island on Second Life where people can explore caves or explore the effects of global warming. Likewise, NASA has taken advantage of a few social networking tools, including Twitter and Flickr. The NSA builds profiles of individuals by mapping out their social media connections, combining it with other online sources of information such as banking details, GPS information, and political affiliation, to find "predictive" behavior that might lead to a crime. NASA is using such tools to aid the Review of U.S. Human Space Flight Plans Committee, whose goal it is to ensure that the nation is on a vigorous and sustainable path to achieving its boldest aspirations in space.

=== Business applications ===
The use of social networking services in an enterprise context presents the potential of having a major impact on the world of business and work. Social networks connect people at low cost; this can be beneficial for entrepreneurs and small businesses looking to expand their contact bases. These networks often act as a customer relationship management tool for companies selling products and services. Companies can also use social networks for advertising in the form of banners and text ads. Since businesses operate globally, social networks can make it easier to keep in touch with contacts around the world. Applications for social networking sites have extended toward businesses and brands are creating their own, high functioning sites, a sector known as brand networking. It is the idea that a brand can build its consumer relationship by connecting their consumers to the brand image on a platform that provides them relative content, elements of participation, and a ranking or score system. Brand networking is a new way to capitalize on social trends as a marketing tool. The power of social networks is beginning to permeate into internal culture of businesses where they are finding uses for collaboration, file sharing and knowledge transfer. The term "enterprise social software" is becoming increasingly popular for these types of applications.

=== Dating applications ===
Many social networks provide an online environment for people to communicate and exchange personal information for dating purposes. Intentions can vary from looking for a one time date, short-term relationships, and long-term relationships. Most of these social networks, just like online dating services, require users to give out certain pieces of information. This usually includes a user's age, gender, location, interests, and perhaps a picture. Releasing very personal information is usually discouraged for safety reasons. This allows other users to search or be searched by some sort of criteria, but at the same time, people can maintain a degree of anonymity similar to most online dating services. Online dating sites are similar to social networks in the sense that users create profiles to meet and communicate with others, but their activities on such sites are for the sole purpose of finding a person of interest to date. Social networks do not necessarily have to be for dating; many users simply use it for keeping in touch with friends, and colleagues.

However, an important difference between social networks and online dating services is the fact that online dating sites usually require a fee, where social networks are free. This difference is one of the reasons the online dating industry is seeing a massive decrease in revenue due to many users opting to use social networking services instead. Many popular online dating services such as Match.com, Yahoo Personals, and eHarmony.com are seeing a decrease in users, where social networks like MySpace and Facebook are experiencing an increase in users. The number of Internet users in the United States that visit online dating sites has fallen from a peak of 21% in 2003 to 10% in 2006. Whether it is the cost of the services, the variety of users with different intentions, or any other reason, it is undeniable that social networking sites are quickly becoming the new way to find dates online.

=== Educational applications ===
The National School Boards Association reports that almost 60% of students who use social networking talk about education topics online, and more than 50% talk specifically about schoolwork. Yet the vast majority of school districts have stringent rules against nearly all forms of social networking during the school day—even though students and parents report few problem behaviors online. Social networks focused on supporting relationships between teachers and their students are now used for learning, educators professional development, and content sharing. HASTAC is a collaborative social network space for new modes of learning and research in higher education, K-12, and lifelong learning; Ning supports teachers; TermWiki, TeachStreet and other sites are being built to foster relationships that include educational blogs, portfolios, formal and ad hoc communities, as well as communication such as chats, discussion threads, and synchronous forums. These sites also have content sharing and rating features. Social networks are also emerging as online yearbooks, both public and private. One such service is MyYearbook, which allows anyone from the general public to register and connect. A new trend emerging is private label yearbooks accessible only by students, parents, and teachers of a particular school, similar to Facebook's beginning within Harvard.

=== Finance applications ===
The use of virtual currency systems inside social networks create new opportunities for global finance. Hub Culture operates a virtual currency Ven used for global transactions among members, product sales and financial trades in commodities and carbon credits. In May 2010, carbon pricing contracts were introduced to the weighted basket of currencies and commodities that determine the floating exchange value of Ven. The introduction of carbon to the calculation price of the currency made Ven the first and only currency that is linked to the environment.

=== Medical and health applications ===
Social networks are beginning to be adopted by healthcare professionals as a means to manage institutional knowledge, disseminate peer to peer knowledge and to highlight individual physicians and institutions. The advantage of using a dedicated medical social networking site is that all the members are screened against the state licensing board list of practitioners. A new trend is emerging with social networks created to help its members with various physical and mental ailments. For people suffering from life-altering diseases or chronic health conditions, companies such as HealthUnlocked and PatientsLikeMe offers their members the chance to connect with others dealing with similar issues and share experiences. For alcoholics and addicts, SoberCircle gives people in recovery the ability to communicate with one another and strengthen their recovery through the encouragement of others who can relate to their situation. DailyStrength is also a website that offers support groups for a wide array of topics and conditions, including the support topics offered by PatientsLikeMe and SoberCircle. Some social networks aim to encourage healthy lifestyles in their users. SparkPeople and HealthUnlocked offer community and social networking tools for peer support during weight loss. Fitocracy and QUENTIQ are focused on exercise, enabling users to share their own workouts and comment on those of other users. Other aspects of social network usage include the analysis of data coming from existing social networks (such as Twitter) to discover large crowd concentration events (based on tweets location statistical analysis) and disseminate the information to e.g. mobility-challenged individuals for e.g. avoiding the specific areas and optimizing their journey in an urban environment.

=== Social and political applications ===
Social networking sites have recently showed a value in social and political movements. In the Egyptian revolution, Facebook and Twitter both played an allegedly pivotal role in keeping people connected to the revolt. Egyptian activists have credited social networking sites with providing a platform for planning protest and sharing news from Tahrir Square in real time. By presenting a platform for thousands of people to instantaneously share videos of mainly events featuring brutality, social networking can be a vital tool in revolutions. On the flip side, social networks enable government authorities to easily identify, and repress, protestors and dissidents. Another political application of social media is promoting the involvement of younger generations in politics and ongoing political issues.

One of the earliest major political uses of social media occurred during Barack Obama's 2008 presidential campaign. The campaign integrated social media platforms, text messaging, email and online videos to communicate with voters, recruit volunteers, and raise funds.

During the election, the campaign maintained profiles on over 15 social networking sites, accumulating approximately 5 million connections, including over 3 million followers on Facebook. Additionally, the campaign published nearly 2,000 YouTube videos, which have received over 80 million views combined.

In 2007, when Obama first announced his candidacy, there was no such thing as an iPhone or Twitter. However, a year later, Obama was sending out voting reminders to thousands of people through Twitter, showing just how fast social media moves. Obama's campaign was current and needed to be successful in incorporating social media, as social media acts best and is most effective in real time.

Building up to the 2012 presidential election, it was interesting to see how strong the influence of social media would be following the 2008 campaigns, where Obama's winning campaign had been social media-heavy, whereas McCain's campaign did not really grasp social media. John F. Kennedy was the first president who really understood television, and similarly, Obama is the first president to fully understand the power of social media. Obama has recognized social media is about creating relationships and connections and therefore used social media to the advantage of presidential election campaigns, in which Obama has dominated his opponents in terms of social media space.

Other political campaigns have followed on from Obama's successful social media campaigns, recognizing the power of social media and incorporating it as a key factor embedded within their political campaigns, for example, Donald Trump's presidential electoral campaign, 2016. Dan Pfeiffer, Obama's former digital and social media guru, commented that Donald Trump is "way better at the internet than anyone else in the GOP which is partly why he is winning".

Research has shown that 66% of social media users actively engage in political activity online, and like many other behaviors, online activities translate into offline ones. With research from the 'MacArthur Research Network on Youth and Participatory Politics' stating that young people who are politically active online are double as likely to vote than those who are not politically active online. Therefore, political applications of social networking sites are crucial, particularly to engage with the youth, who perhaps are the least educated in politics and the most in social networking sites. Social media is, therefore, a very effective way in which politicians can connect with a younger audience through their political campaigns.

On June 28, 2020, The New York Times released an article sharing the finding of two researchers who studied the impact of TikTok, a video-sharing and social networking application, on political expression. The application, besides being a creative space to express oneself, has been used maliciously to spread disinformation ahead of US President Donald Trump's Tulsa rally in Oklahoma and amplified footage of police brutality at Black Lives Matter protests.

=== Crowdsourcing applications ===
Crowdsourcing social media platform, such as Design Contest, Arcbazar, Tongal, combined group of professional freelancers, such as designers, and help them communicate with business owners interested in their suggestion. This process is often used to subdivide tedious work or to fund-raise startup companies and charities, and can also occur offline.

== Open source software ==
There are a number of projects that aim to develop free and open source software to use for social networking services. These technologies are often referred to as social engine or social networking engine software.

== Largest social networking services ==
The following is a list of the largest social networking services, in order by number of active users, as of January 2024, as published by Statista:

Service	Active users (in millions)
Facebook	3,049
YouTube	2,491
WhatsApp*	2,000
Instagram	2,000
TikTok	1,562
WeChat	1,336
Facebook Messenger	979
Telegram	800
Douyin**	752
Snapchat	750
Kuaishou	685
X (Twitter)	619
Sina Weibo	605
QQ	558
Pinterest	482

*Platforms have not published updated user figures in the past 12 months, figures may be out of date and less reliable
**Figure uses daily active users, so monthly active user number is likely higher

== See also ==
- Anonymous social media
- Collective intelligence
- Comparison of research networking tools and research profiling systems
- Distributed social network
- Enterprise bookmarking
- Sex differences in social media use
- Geosocial networking
- Internet
- Internet forum
- Lateral diffusion
- List of social gaming networks
- List of social networking services
- Mass collaboration
- Mobile social network
- Personal network
- Professional network service
- Virtual volunteering
- Social aspects of television
- Social bookmarking
- Social identity
- Social media
- Social network
- Social seating
- Social software
- Social television
- Social web
- Virtual community
- List of most popular social platforms
