= Ovacome =

Ovacome is a charitable incorporated organisation based in the UK which exists to support anyone affected by ovarian cancer. The charity's main office is located in London, with a regional hub in Dudley.

It was founded in 1996 by Sarah Dickinson, who had been diagnosed with the disease and found that there was little to no support or information available. Over 25 years later, the charity operates on a national level and supports around 20,000 people each year.

Ovacome provides a range of support and information services, including:

- A telephone and email support line
- Online and in-person support groups
- A 24 hour Healthunlocked forumLocal and digital events with expert speakers
- Information booklets and resources, written and reviewed by a panel of experts working in the field

In 2020, the charity expanded its support service to provide help in six additional languages widely spoken in the UK: Bengali, Urdu, Gujarati, Polish, Punjabi and Arabic. Ovacome now offers telephone support lines and awareness materials in these languages.

The charity's services and information resources are supported by an expert advisory panel, made up of clinicians and allied health professionals.

Ovacome also operates a number of programmes looking increase awareness of the symptoms and ovarian cancer, and improve quality of care. Ovacome is the only UK provider of the Survivors Teaching Students project, through which volunteers living with ovarian cancer share their experiences with medical and nursing students, identifying areas for improvement in diagnosis and care.

Ovacome has been recognised in several sector awards; the charity was shortlisted for the 2022 Charity Awards, 2022 Markel 3rd Sector Care Awards, and 2021 BBC Radio 4 All in the Mind Awards.
