= HealthUnlocked =

Social networking service for health

- Website type: Social networking service
- Available in: English, Spanish and Portuguese
- Website: www.healthunlocked.com
- Current status: Active

HealthUnlocked is a social networking service for health. The company uses health-specific artificial intelligence to support patients to better manage their own health, by recommending relevant and tailored health content, information and services to patients The site enables peer support for various health conditions and promotes patient empowerment by actively engaging people with their healthcare.

== History ==
HealthUnlocked was founded in 2010 by Jorge Armanet (CEO) and Dr Matt Jameson Evans (Chief Medical Officer), to transform how information and data are used and treated in healthcare and support people with health conditions to connect together online. Jameson Evans, a doctor in the NHS, had previously been chairman of Remedy UK.

Initially, the company focused on building self-reporting trackers for symptoms and treatment outcomes.

The main HealthUnlocked website, was launched in 2011, focused on building online support groups in which patients can give each other insight about their conditions, in a way that healthcare professionals are not able to. Since this time, the site has grown exponentially with the number of conversations occurring increasing from 1.4 million in 2012, to 5.1 million in 2014.

In 2015, HealthUnlocked was chosen as 1 of 17 successful entrepreneurs to join the NHS Innovation Accelerator, a scheme to give support to new technologies that could revolutionise healthcare for patients, hospitals and GP's.

In July 2019 it formed a partnership with Patients Know Best, integrating its eSocial Prescription capability with their award-winning digital platform to enable more-holistic, personalised care plans in the form of a social prescription.

== Communities ==
The social network hosts online communities within a dedicated health web platform. There are currently over 700 different health communities on the HealthUnlocked website, for a wide range of health and wellbeing conditions. After registering to use the site, users can create a user profile and join one or more of these online communities. Many of the online communities are run in partnership with health organizations, non-profit organization's (NPO) and charities worldwide, including Anxiety and Depression Association of America (ADAA), British Liver Trust, Endometriosis UK and The Multiple Sclerosis Association Of America. Each month over 4M people from across the world come to the platform, the majority of which are from the UK and US. HealthUnlocked is in the top 20 private health websites globally according to Alexa Internet. HealthUnlocked is also available through an app for iPhone

A study (2017) by University of Manchester concluded that use of the HealthUnlocked platform positively affects a person's Patient Activation Measure and research (University of Warwick, 2016) found use of platforms such as HealthUnlocked helps people to come together and cope with illnesses and diseases such as diabetes, cancer and mental health problems.

The network was identified as a technology that will change health and care by the Kings Fund, a tech startup that is on track to become one of Britain's next billion dollar companies, and won an award in the Axa PPP Health Tech & You Awards (2017) while being named as a truly standout, disruptive innovation.

HealthUnlocked was one of the first companies selected to join NHS England's, NHS Innovation Accelerator (NIA) programme, which aims to have proven innovations adopted faster and more systematically through the NHS, delivering on the commitment detailed within the Five Year Forward View.

HealthUnlocked works with organisations including think tanks and the pharmaceutical industry to better understand long-term health conditions and to recruit people from its online health communities to surveys, advisory boards and panels, as well as clinical trials. An academic review into patient involvement in drug development found that social media and peer networks are evolving to play a much deeper role in innovation and clinical research in industry and changing opportunities for patients to participate in research and development of new therapies. A study into patients experiences on steroids taken from data on the health platform found that the timing of glucocorticoid administration varies significantly in patients, potentially influencing effectiveness and side effects.

The company has also worked with the Institute for Public Policy Research, surveying its users to better understand the attitudes and activities of people with long-term conditions.

== Reception ==
HealthUnlocked was named one of "13 Startups in London You Should Know About" by Business Vibes as well as one of "London's 7 Fast-Growing & Disruptive Startups" by The Huffington Post. It was also named one of Business Cloud's 101 Top Healthtech Innovators, noted as one of Evening Standard's 5 best apps for mental health and also named in FT 1000's 3rd annual list of Europe's fastest-growing companies.

== Validation ==
A research study which followed newly registered users to HealthUnlocked concluded that Patient activation seems to increase over time. Activation increased the most in those with very high engagement with HealthUnlocked and in those with low activation at baseline.

== See also ==
- Weight Wins
