= Social network hosting service =

Type of web hosting service

A social network hosting service is a web hosting service that specifically hosts the user creation of web-based social networking services, alongside related applications. Such services are also known as vertical social networks due to the creation of SNSes which cater to specific user interests and niches; like larger, interest-agnostic SNSes, such niche networking services may also possess the ability to create increasingly niche groups of users.

== List of social network hosting services ==
- Federated Media Publishing's BigTent
- BroadVision Clearvale
- Ning
- Wall.fm
