= WELL Health Technologies =

North American telemedicine company

- Type: public company
- Traded as: TSX: WELL
- Industry: Healthcare
- Founded: 2018
- Founders: Hamed Shahbazi
- Headquarters: Vancouver, British Columbia, Canada
- Area served: North America
- Key people: Hamed Shahbazi (Chairman and CEO), Eva Fong (CFO), Chris Ericksen (Vice President)
- Services: Primary healthcare, EMR, cybersecurity, patient-to-physician teleconferencing, medical appointments
- Revenue: $919 million (2024)
- Number of employees: 2400+
- Website: www.well.company

WELL Health Technologies is a digital health technology company based in Canada and serving outpatient health clinics. The company owns and operates primary healthcare facilities in Canada and the United States, and provides (SaaS) EMR services to clinics and doctors in Canada. Well Health Technologies is publicly traded on the Toronto Stock Exchange under the symbol WELL.TO.

== History ==
WELL Health Technologies company was established in February 2018 and first went public in January 2020 on the Toronto Stock Exchange.

WELL Health Technologies experienced a rapid growth during the COVID-19 Pandemic. Its shares rose from $1.80 in January 2020 to the peak of $9.20 per share in February 2021, returning to the $3.00 range by 2023.

In 2021, WELL Health Technologies acquired the US-based CRH Medical Corp, ExecHealth, Intrahealth Systems, and MyHealth.

In April 2021, the company was the subject of an analysis claiming it to be "a Toxic Roll-Up" and accusing it of various forms of malpractice, including aspects of the CRH acquisition. Other analysts disagreed.

== Description ==
WELL Health Technologies has its main offices based out of Vancouver, British Columbia, Canada. The company's founder and CEO is Hamed Shahbazi. The company's main activity is telemedicine, such as teleconferencing, clinical database management, electronic medical records (EMR), cybersecurity, billing, digital apps, and more. WELL Health Technologies mainly operates in Canada and United States.

== See also ==
- Telemedicine service providers
- Telehealth
- Electronic health record
