= Solve =

Solve may refer to:

- Sölve, Viking king of Sweden
- SOLVE, an American environmental organization
- Solve (advertising agency)
- "Solve" (song), by Japanese pop band Dream
- HSwMS Sölve

== See also ==
- Equation solving
- Problem solving
- Solution (disambiguation)
