= Richard Smith (editor) =

British medical doctor, editor, and businessman

Richard Smith is a British medical doctor, editor, and businessman.

== Biography ==
=== Achievements ===
He was the director of the UnitedHealth Chronic Disease Initiative at Emory University (which grew out of the UnitedHealth “Ovations initiative”), which together with the US National Heart, Lung, and Blood Institute has created 11 centres in low and middle income countries that work on non-communicable disease.

Smith also serves as chair of the Cochrane Library Oversight Committee and a member of the UK Panel on Research Integrity. Additionally, he is currently chairman of the board of directors of Patients Know Best.

Previously he was chief executive of UnitedHealth Europe, a subsidiary of the UnitedHealth Group that works with public health systems in Europe. Before that, from 1991 to 2004, he served as both editor-in-Chief of the BMJ (previously the British Medical Journal), and chief executive of the BMJ Group. Smith worked for the BMJ for twenty-five years, from 1979 to 2004.

He is an honorary professor at Imperial College London and the University of Warwick and a member of the governing council of St George's, University of London.

He is a founding Fellow of the Academy of Medical Sciences, elected in 1998.

Having qualified in medicine in the University of Edinburgh, he worked in hospitals in Scotland and New Zealand before joining the BMJ. He also has a degree in management science from the Stanford Graduate School of Business.

Smith worked for six years as a television doctor with the BBC and TV-AM. He has published in dozens of medical journals, written widely in the lay press and currently blogs regularly for the BMJ. He has received three awards for journalism.

=== Family ===
His brother is comedian Arthur Smith.

== Views ==
=== On medical publishing ===
Smith is the author of the book The Trouble with Medical Journals (2006, ISBN 1-85315-673-6), in which he contends that medical journals have become "creatures of the drug industry", rife with fraudulent research and packed with articles ghost written by pharmaceutical companies. He has also written about the limitations and problems of the peer review process. In 2014, in an interview with New Scientist, he argued for criminalisation of research fraud.

=== On open access publishing ===
Smith is a proponent of open access publishing. He was editor of the BMJ when the journal first moved to online publishing, and made the journal's archives freely available. He sits on the board of directors of the Public Library of Science, an open access publisher of scientific and medical research. He was editor in chief of the open-access Cases Journal, which aimed to create a database of medical case reports.

=== On cancer ===
In December 2014, Smith wrote on the BMJ blog that trying to find a cure for cancer was a waste of money, claiming that, "with love, morphine, and whisky", the disease is the best way to die. His remarks provoked outrage. The British Medical Journal said:

Smith’s New Year’s Eve blog on thebmj.com about cancer offering the best death garnered global media coverage and triggered a social media storm from thousands of bereaved relatives and the parents of children with cancer. He was accused of "glibly glossing over the pain" of cancer, to quote Michael Broderick, one of the 173 respondents on thebmj.com.

Smith responded and tried to clarify some of his points in a follow-up blog post on 5 January.
