= Solve (advertising agency) =

Independent advertising and branding agency

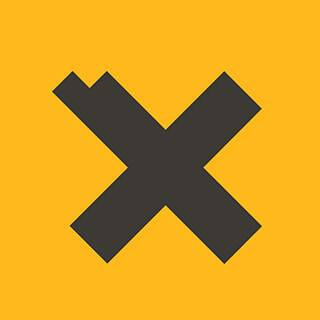
- Industry: Advertising agency
- Founded: 2011; 15 years ago
- Headquarters: Minneapolis, Minnesota, United States
- Key people: John Colasanti (co-founder and CEO); Corey Johnson (co-founder and President)
- Website: www.solve-ideas.com

Solve is an independent advertising and branding agency based in Minneapolis, Minnesota. The agency was founded in late 2011 by CEO John Colasanti, President Corey Johnson and Executive Creative Directors Eric Sorensen and Hans Hansen. Prior to founding Solve, Colasanti and Johnson held executive leadership positions at Carmichael Lynch, while Sorensen and Hansen served as creative directors at Fallon Worldwide.

== History ==
In 2016, Solve became the first U.S.-based advertising agency to field a competitive cycling team supporting both an employee passion and the agency's many cycling clients.

Solve was named Midwest Small Agency of the Year at the 2016 Ad Age Small Agency Awards in Miami. The Small Agency Awards are the premier honors saluting outstanding work created by independent shops with 150 or fewer employees. It marked a second Ad Age award for Solve having been previously recognized as a top small agency in 2013.

In January 2017, Solve expanded its leadership team by naming three senior employees to partners, a new position within the five-year old agency. New Partners are Kara Brower, Ryan Murray and Roman Paluta. A fourth partner was added in May. CP+B, 180, Merkley vet Sean Smith, was hired as Executive Creative Director/Partner.

In January 2019, Sunoco Fuels named Solve its new agency-of-record following a national search and competitive review. In February 2019, Ryan Murray, an account director and partner at the agency, was promoted to Director of Account Management. In April 2019, Pat Horn of Crispin Porter + Bogusky, Victors & Spoils and Creature (company) was hired as ECD.

== Recognition ==
- 2013 – Solve earned a Silver Award in Advertising Age's "Small Agency Of The Year" competition.
- 2014 – Solve won a Gold Effie Award for its "Become Yourself" campaign for client Medifast.
- June 2014 – Solve was named one of the 15 most effective independent ad agencies in North America for 2014 by PSFK and Effie Worldwide.
- November 2014 – Solve was recognized as one of "The 15 Fastest-Growing Independent Agencies in the U.S."
- January 2015 – Solve CEO John Colasanti named among Ten Business Leaders to Watch.
- August 2015 – Solve's "The Blank Video Project" challenged the value of a YouTube view, a metric widely associated with success by agencies and marketers alike.
- October 2015 – Solve was named a national digital "Small Agency of the Year" finalist by iMedia.
- April 2016 – Solve was named One Show Finalist in Consumer: Online Films & Video category for its "The Blank Video Project"
- August 2016 – Solve named 2016 Best Small Agency of the Year, Midwest by Advertising Age
- August 2016 – Solve named to 2016 Inc. 5000 Fastest Growing Companies In America
- December 2016 – Solve featured in winners gallery of 2016 Communication Arts Advertising Annual; "2016 Award of Excellence" recognizes best in visual communication.
- June 2018 – Solve's Indian Motorcycle "Set The Standard" brand campaign recognized by Communication Arts

== Clients ==
Solve clients include Real'Za Pizza, American Standard, Indian Motorcycles, Slingshot, Bentley Motors, True Value Hardware, Porsche, Raymond James, Galbani, Organic Valley, Medifast, Abu Dhabi Commercial Bank, Orbea, Shopko Stores, Founders Brewing Company, The V Foundation for Cancer Research, Radisson Hotels and Sunoco.

== See also ==
- Advantage Solutions
