= Patients Know Best =

British personal health records company

Patients Know Best is a British social enterprise, with an aim of putting patients in control of their own medical records. Its Chairman is Dr Richard Smith (editor). Dr Mohammad Al-Ubaydli is the cofounder and chief executive officer.

== Products ==
The company operates a Single Patient Record architecture across its customer base. The patient can see data in the SPR the company's Personal Health Record viewer. The Population Health Management Engine (PHM) uses data from the SPR to show explanations to the patient in the PHR. The explanations include matching for clinical trials and medication optimisation.

== Data ==
PKB receives data in a patient's record in a number of ways:

1. Automatically receiving data from customers and partners about a patient through a direct integration with PKB's APIs.
2. Automatically pulling data from electronic medical records systems after a patient registers for PKB. This includes data from GP electronic medical records systems in England and any provider in the Netherlands.
3. Manual entry of data by a user such as the patient in the PHR viewer.

The data ownership model of PKB is for the patient to own their record. The patient shares who can access the record and what parts they can access. The sharing is either explicit consent manually from the patient or implicit consent automatically from providers of direct care to the patient. The Privacy Notice provides more details.

== Governments ==
Patients Know Best works directly with governments at national scale, alongside its customers who are health care providers.

- England: PHR integration into the national health app NHS App
- Netherlands: integration into the Dutch government's personal health records infrastructure persoonlijke gezondheidsomgeving (PGO).
- Nigeria: Single Patient Record for the state of Lagos and its 20 million population.
- Wales: PHR integration into the national health NHS Wales app

The system is the preferred personal health record for London. It is in use in 22 different languages at more than 60 hospitals throughout the UK, Ireland, Germany, Hong Kong, the US and the Netherlands.

After trials conducted by Abertawe Bro Morgannwg University Health Board it is to be rolled out across Wales in 2017.

== Partnerships ==
- Holly Health: "The integration with PKB allows the Holly Health coaching service and PKB records to ‘speak’ to each other, so that members of the public can transfer blood pressure readings and lifestyle health data into their personal records"
- HealthUnlocked: integrating their eSocial Prescription capability to enable more holistic, personalised care plans.
- MyHealthChecked PLC: "the consumer home-testing healthcare company, announces that it has signed a partnership agreement with Patients Know Best ("PKB") to enable customers using at-home Blood and DNA tests from MyHealthChecked to access their laboratory test results via the NHS App".
- PocDoc: "PocDoc Healthy Heart Check can view and share their screening results and see all of their data through the NHS App, which PKB is integrated with ".
