= Wall.fm =

Online service for people to build and host social networking services

Oxwall
- Website type: Social network builder
- Available in: English
- Owner: Skalfa LLC
- Creator: Skalfa LLC
- Website: www.oxwall.com
- Commercial: Yes
- Registration: Yes
- Current status: Active

Wall.fm is an online service for people to build and host social networking services, powered by Oxwall software. Wall.fm allows users over 18 years old to register a free account and create custom social networking websites. The site creation process does not involve any coding, and consists of only two steps. The distinctive Wall.fm features are user roles (member access permissions), customizable themes, activity newsfeed, website/profile/content privacy, monetization pack. One of its main competitive advantages is that the service is built on an open source platform, which means a certain degree of freedom for site owners. Wall.fm offers three plans: Starter, Pro and Ultimate. Plans offer different feature sets, disk space and bandwidth, individual support and vendor's branding removal. Every plan offers free trial.

== History ==
Wall.fm was launched as WackWall in February 2010. The second version of WackWall, which was later renamed to Wall.fm, was powered by OpenWack software that eventually evolved into Oxwall. Wall.fm exited beta in October 2010, and started introducing paid plans and changes to free accounts, such as displaying the vendor's ads across the free plan sites, and including a site monetization pack into Ultimate plan features. On May 15, 2011 Wall.fm updated their Terms of Use limiting the use of the service to persons over 18 years old, and introducing regulations for sites intended for use by children under 13 years old. On February 27, 2012 Wall.fm announced significant changes in their pricing policy and user account interface, making subscription plans more affordable although limited in disk space/bandwidth, and site account management more user-friendly. As of May 2011, over 3000 sites are built with Wall.fm service each month.

As of January 2013, Wall.fm only offers free site registration by invites.

== Features ==
Wall.fm provides all the basic functionality required to build a social website: user roles, photo/video sharing, chat, blogs, forum, groups, events, activity stream. It supports site/profile/content privacy, and allows for a certain degree of site pages customization by users and administrator, as well as general design alteration via CSS styles. Wall.fm also has site monetization features available with Pro and Ultimate plans: user credits, membership levels, and payment providers. Because features are developed as plugin extensions, they can be easily enabled/disabled via the admin dashboard.

== Wall.fm for education ==
Granular control over user roles and permissions along with privacy settings and a simplified network creation process makes Wall.fm attractive for online educators. The changes in Wall.fm Terms of Use are also intended to make the service more education-friendly.

== Support and community ==
Wall.fm staff provide free support via public discussion boards. Wall.fm community members can find answers to frequently asked questions, report bugs and problems, and post feature suggestions. Pro and Ultimate plans come with an individual email support option.
