= Single Patient Record =

System of unifying medical records

A single patient record (SPR) is a single medical record about a patient containing data from multiple sources. Governments in several countries are starting to create these records, and legislate for health care providers to release copies of the data they hold a patient into these systems.

== European Union countries ==
Countries in the European Union have traditionally opted for a sub-national, regional approach. For example:

- Italy: Fascicolo Sanitario Elettronico (FSE), the Italian National PHR, was introduced from Art. 12 of Law Decree 18 Oct 2012 n. 179. Each region had to create and implement a PHR by June 20, 2015. The user interfaces, systems, and software must ensure full interoperability at regional, national, and European levels.
- Sweden: the National Service Platform (NTjP) receives data from all medical records systems in each of the 21 regions.
- Spain: has mandated sharing at regional level, such as Catalonia and Andalucia.

Countries with small populations operate a single national record, including:

- Cyprus: the national unified health data bank is expected to be completed by end of December 2025, following a parallel procurement process
- Estonia: Estonian Nationwide Health Information System’ (EHIS) is run by The Ministry of Social Affairs.
- Hungary: the Human Resource Development Operating Programme focused on establishing the Electronic Health Service and Data Integration System (EESZT).
- France : the Dossier médical partagé (shared medical record), rebranded as Mon espace santé (my health space) since 2021, was launched in 2011 to create a national online medical record. It is managed by Health Insurance and the Ministry of Health.

EU nation states are starting to implement their compliance with the European Health Data Space (EHDS) legislation. The approach is a system-to-system copying of data between national systems, on demand by the needs of the patient, without consolidating into a single patient record.

== England ==
NHS England's 10-year plan included the requirement for a Single Patient Record. In May 2025 it released a Request for Information (RFI) notice to industry, showing NHSE's requirements.

The original stated vision for the SPR was to:

1. Give patients visibility and control of their data, enabling them to read, write, share joint care plans and offer corrections to data - while also being able to manage sharing preferences and have access to an audit of who has viewed their record and for what purpose.
2. Provide a single version of the truth by integrating data across settings, enabling patients, health care professionals and social care providers to work from the same record and to see key primary and secondary care NHS interactions, as well as autonomously prompt actions to occur.
3. Enable the secure availability of data for third-party applications such as research and clinical trials (allowing for patient choice).

In September 2025 NHS England announced three architectures of implementation, none of which allows storage of data in a single record.

== Nigeria ==
Nigeria's federal government legislated that every state must procure and maintain an SPR. Lagos is the first state to complete procurement, choosing Interswitch which partnered with Patients Know Best to deliver this.

== Saudi Arabia ==
Saudi Arabia's Council for Health Insurance and the National Health Information Center, in cooperation with the Ministry of Health, launched NPHIES platform to facilitate the exchange of health information for patients. The health information exchange has two component, NPHIES Taameen (insurance) and NPHIES Sehey [health] "a distinction that is believed to meet the necessary complexities of Saudi Arabia's healthcare system, which includes both public and private sectors"

== South Africa ==
President Cyril Ramaphosa highlighted an SPR as a critical component for the country during South Africa's State of the Nation Address on 6 February

== Technology providers ==
- Patients Know Best (PKB) already operates an SPR for its customers in different regions. In 2024 it won the contract to deliver an SPR for Lagos State in Nigeria, with a population over 20 million.
- Orion Health provides the single patient record of eight million patients for the Kingdom of Saudi Arabia, on a platform called NPHIES.
