= One Medical =

American healthcare company based in San Francisco, California

Amazon One Medical

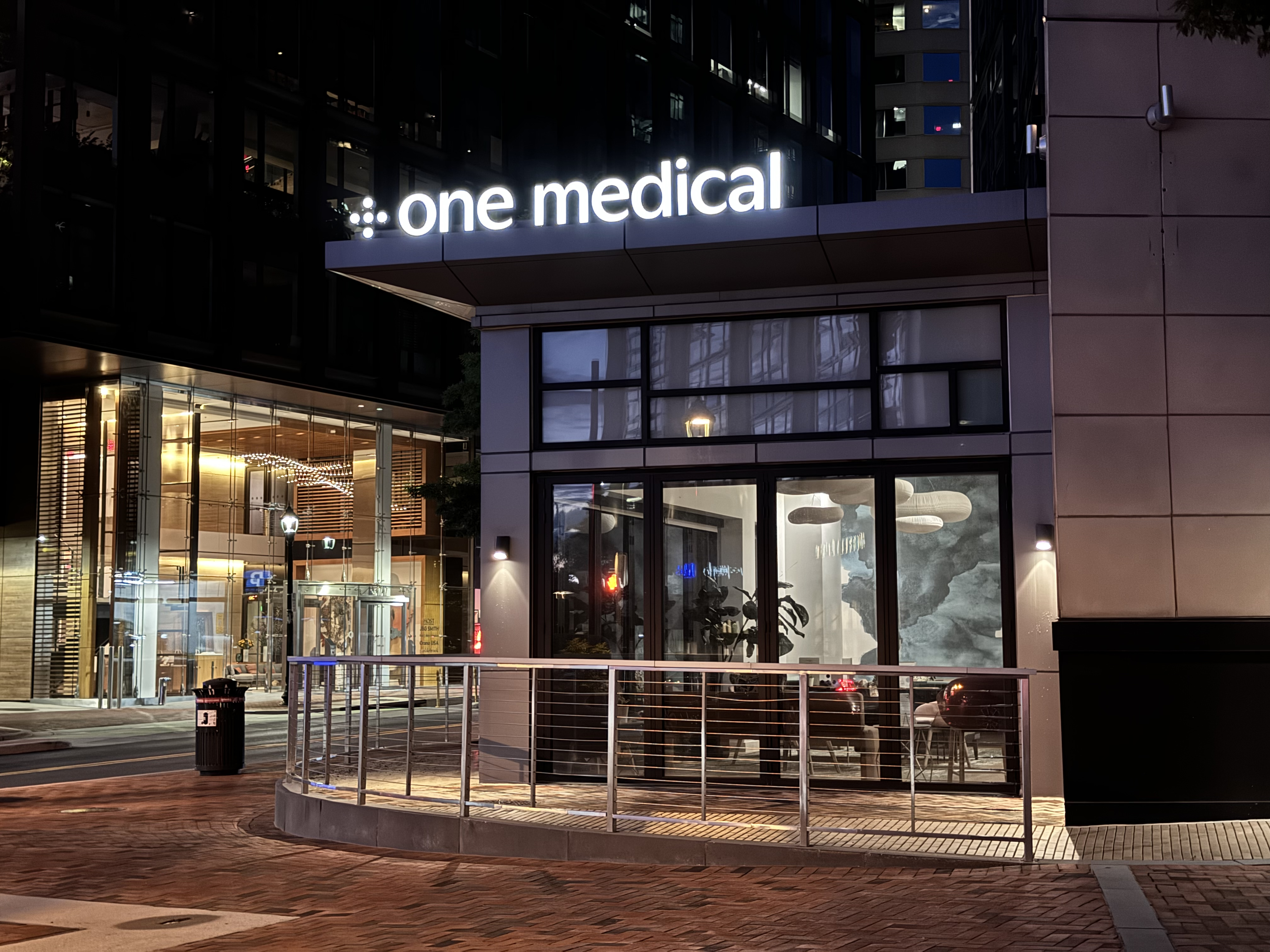
- A One Medical clinic in Bethesda, Maryland
- Trade name: One Medical
- Type: Subsidiary
- Industry: Primary healthcare
- Founded: 2007; 19 years ago, San Francisco, California, U.S.
- Founder: Tom Lee
- Headquarters: One Embarcadero Center; San Francisco
- Key people: Trent Green (CEO)
- Revenue: ▲US$1.05 billion (2022)
- Operating income: ▼US$−420 million (2022)
- Net income: ▼US$−398 million (2022)
- Total assets: ▼US$2.43 billion (2022)
- Total equity: ▼US$1.54 billion (2022)
- Number of employees: 3,698 (2022)
- Parent: Amazon, Inc.
- Website: onemedical.com

Amazon One Medical is a primary care health service provided by Amazon with in-person care and online resources, including a mobile app. Founded by 1Life Healthcare, Inc. in 2007, it was acquired by Amazon in February 2023 and incorporated in to the company's Prime membership offerings.

== History ==
One Medical was founded by Tom Lee in 2007. The company grew from a single San Francisco clinic to more than 72 locations across the United States, including 29 clinics in the greater San Francisco Bay Area. 1Life Healthcare, Inc. serves as an administrative and managerial services company for physician-owned professional corporations.

In 2017, Amir Rubin succeeded Tom Lee as CEO of One Medical. In 2018, The Carlyle Group invested $350 million in the company. One Medical was also backed by Google's parent company Alphabet Inc.

On January 31, 2020, One Medical began trading on the Nasdaq stock exchange.

During the early stages of vaccine distribution, One Medical was accused of administering the COVID-19 vaccine to ineligible patients in several states. This resulted in a Congressional investigation. The investigation concluded that One Medical sought to use its access to COVID vaccines for financial gain, by pushing those looking for vaccines towards its own paid memberships, and that it provided early access vaccines to those with insider connections at the company.

In September 2021, One Medical acquired Iora Health.

In 2024, Amazon's then-other healthcare offering Amazon Clinic was integrated with One Medical to become its pay-per-visit services.

In 2025, Amazon Pharmacy announced it would install automated prescription-dispensing kiosks at One Medical clinics. They'd carry commonly prescribed medications such as antibiotics, inhalers, blood pressure treatments, and seasonal medications, such as for flu and allergies. Patients would be able to pick up these medications within minutes of their appointment. The initial rollout launched at select locations in the Los Angeles area late 2025, with plans to scale nationwide in 2026.

In 2026, One Medical launched a HIPAA-compliant generative AI chatbot called Health AI in their app. The chatbot has patients' personal context, such as their medical records, lab results, current medications, to incorporate into its responses.

== Acquisition by Amazon ==
In July 2022, it was announced that Amazon, Inc. agreed to acquire One Medical for about $3.9 billion in an all-cash deal. Prior to the announcement, pharmacy chain CVS Health had also bid for the company. Amazon formally acquired One Medical on February 22, 2023.

In November 2023, Amazon began offering discounted One Medical memberships to Amazon Prime customers.

=== Reaction ===
Following news of the acquisition, several commentators and public advocacy groups expressed concern that the deal would harm patient privacy. U.S. Senator Josh Hawley, a Republican from Missouri, urged the Federal Trade Commission (FTC) to scrutinize the deal.

Oregon's health agency, the Oregon Health Authority (OHA) was empowered to assess the deal as there were five One Medical clinics operating in the state as of 2022. In December 2022, the OHA ultimately concluded in its preliminary review of the acquisition that the acquisition would not lead to a substantial reduction in affordable healthcare in the state. As such, the OHA approved the acquisition.

In 2023, One Medical was listed as a sponsor of Tru Con, an annual conference of the Truman Center, a national security think tank.

=== Antitrust scrutiny ===
Following the announcement of the acquisition, observers speculated that the deal may face antitrust scrutiny. In September 2022, a SEC filing by 1Life Healthcare revealed that the FTC had begun a probe into the deal.

On February 21, 2023, the FTC ultimately declined to challenge the deal with an antitrust lawsuit before the acquisition was completed. The acquisition was officially completed the next day, on February 22, 2023. The FTC clarified that it is still investigating the merger and may still choose to challenge the acquisition.
