= Andrea Troxel =

American biostatistician

Andrea Beth Troxel is an American biostatistician whose research involves longitudinal data, missing data, the design of clinical trials, and behavioral economics (the study of how financial incentives to medical patients such as diet rewards can affect their health). She is a professor in the Department of Population Health and director of the Division of Biostatistics in the New York University Grossman School of Medicine.

== Education and career ==
Troxel studied applied mathematics at Yale University, graduating cum laude in 1991. She completed a doctorate (Sc.D.) at the Harvard T.H. Chan School of Public Health in 1995. Her dissertation, Methods for the Analysis of Longitudinal Measurements Subject to Nonignorable Non-Monotone Missing Data, was supervised by David P. Harrington.

After postdoctoral research from 1995 to 1997 at the Fred Hutchinson Cancer Center, she became an assistant professor of clinical public health at Columbia University in 1997, changing her affiliation to Columbia's Department of Biostatistics in 2000. She moved to the Perelman School of Medicine at the University of Pennsylvania in 2003, becoming a full professor there in 2011 before moving to her present position at New York University in 2016. Troxel now co-leads the Zoster Eye Disease Study (ZEDS) as Director and MPI, overseeing the study's Statistics and Data Coordinating Center.

== Recognition ==
Troxel was elected as a Fellow of the American Statistical Association in 2012.
