= Diet rewards =

Health incentive program

Diet rewards are incentives, such as cash payments, to individuals to maintain good health and wellness by a healthy diet, particularly a diet aimed at reaching a healthy weight. This has been a trend in both the US and the UK. The Biggest Loser reality TV series increased public awareness of the idea of losing weight for cash and the importance of regular weigh-ins.

== Evidence of effectiveness ==
Several academic studies have concluded that financial incentives are effective for producing weight loss. The Kevin G. Volpp et al. study found that dieters with incentives were five times more likely to reach their goal. How incentives are delivered appears to play a role in their effectiveness. In a 2016 study, insurance premium adjustments as high as $550 were shown to be ineffective in driving weight loss.

== Organizations and programs ==
=== Direct to consumers ===
Among the current providers of weight loss incentives for consumers are:

- HealthyWage (US): Pays individuals $200 for losing 10% of their weight, and up to $1,000 for reaching a healthy weight. Founded in 2009, based in New York.
- Weigh and Win (Colorado, US): Program that pays Colorado citizens to lose weight. Sponsored by Kaiser Permanente and operated by Incentahealth.
- WeightLossWars (US): Website allows groups and individuals to set up and administer weight loss competitions, including for money. Founded in 2004, based in Texas.
- Dietbet (US): Website that organizes weight loss competitions among friends to lose 8 lbs over 4 weeks. Founded in 2010, based in New York.
- Fatbet.net (US): Website allows individuals to set weight loss goals and arrange bets and competitions with friends.
- Weight Wins (UK): Provides personal incentive plans for individuals that pays them for each pound of weight loss plus a bonus for long-term success. Maximum reward £3,000 on a 24-month plan. Founded in 2008, based in London.

Providers of health and wellness incentives for consumers, including weight loss, include:

- stickK (US): Website where individuals commit to stopping smoking, losing weight, or other personal resolutions; if they fail, they surrender money to charity. Founded in 2007, based in New York.
- HealthRally (US): Website which permits friends to motivate one another to stop smoking, get in shape, or lose weight by pledging money and gifts. Founded in 2010, based in San Francisco.
- Zamzee (US): An online rewards program for teens who earn credits for physical activity by wearing a personal activity meter. Founded in 2010, based in San Francisco.

=== For employers ===
Providers of weight loss incentive programs to corporate employers include:

- Tangerine Wellness (US): Founded in 2004, based in New Hampshire.
- Incentahealth (US): Founded in 2004, based in Denver, Colorado.
- HealthyWage (US): Runs team weight loss competitions for companies. The team with the highest percentage weight loss wins, and gets $10,000. Founded in 2009, based in New York.
- Weight Wins (UK): Provides personal incentive plans via employers.

Providers of health incentive programs to corporate employers include:

- PruHealth (Vitality program) (UK): Private medical insurer that rewards clients’ employees for healthy behaviour with Vitality points for shopping.
- RedBrick Health (US)
- VAL Health (US): Runs behavioral economics based incentives for employers' existing health and wellness programs.
- Virgin Health Miles (US): Part of the Virgin Group.

== See also ==
- Dieting
- List of diets
