= Social seating =

Social seating is a type of social networking service that enables users to select their seatmates based on their personal preferences and social network profiles. This system utilizes data from Facebook, LinkedIn, Twitter and other social networks to allow users to view individuals with similar interests and then book a seat accordingly. Social seating operates as an opt-in system, which means that passengers or clients of a service implementing a social seating program will not have their information accessed unless they agree to it voluntarily. This feature is currently available with a few airlines, notably KLM and Malaysia Airlines, is also offered for music events through Ticketmaster.

== History ==
The practice of social seating has a long history, dating back centuries. In ancient times, individuals would often select their companions based on shared social status or interests. For example, in ancient Greece, affluent citizens would frequently congregate at public gatherings, while individuals in servitude would occupy separate seating areas.

In the contemporary era, social seating has been embraced with the advent of social media. Platforms such as Facebook and Twitter have facilitated connections with like-minded individuals, simplifying the task of finding potential seatmates.

In 2011, KLM pioneered the first commercial social seating program: Meet & Seat. This innovative program allowed passengers to view profiles of other travelers on their flight and request specific seatmates.

Since then, additional social seating programs have emerged, including SeatID, Ticketmaster, and Eventbrite. These platforms empower users to select seatmates for various events such as flights, concerts, and sporting events.

Here are some key milestones in the history of social seating:

- 2011: KLM launches the first commercial social seating program, Meet & Seat.
- 2012: SeatID launches a social seating app for concerts and other events.
- 2013: Ticketmaster adds a social seating feature to its website.
- 2014: Eventbrite introduces a social seating feature for events.
- 2015: The first social seating program for trains is launched in the United Kingdom.

== Applications ==
Social seating is a technology that can be used in various industries such as flights, trains, theatres, and sports events. In the flight industry, airlines utilize this technology to allow customers to choose their potential seatmates based on personal information gathered from social networks like Facebook, LinkedIn, or Twitter. For example, KLM's Meet and Seat program allows passengers to access the system at least forty-eight hours before their flight, edit their profile, view other passengers' profiles, and see a seating map showing the location of other passengers who have opted in. Different levels of social integration exist, with companies like Hong Kong-based Satisfly allowing passengers to indicate their "mood" regarding interaction with their seatmates - whether they want to talk, chat casually, listen to music alone, or sleep. This technology gives travelers more control over their seating and interactions during flights. For example, sales professionals can choose their flights based on potential customers also on the plane, allowing businesses to make sales pitches. Additionally, airlines can use the information from these systems to develop more personal relationships with passengers by accessing details like upcoming birthdays and anniversaries.

== Availability ==
The technology is currently mainly used by airlines. However, Eran Savir, the founder of social seating service SeatID, has expressed his hope that this technology will expand to other industries such as theaters, sporting events, trains, and other services where people book seats. An example of this is Ticketmaster, which in 2011, allowed users to tag their seats at events and share that information with their Facebook friends. In 2012, Ticketmaster took this further by introducing an app that recommends nearby concerts based on the artists a user listens to on music services like Spotify and the discontinued Rdio.

== Privacy Concerns ==
Despite the added social benefits that social seating can provide, such as networking and meeting new people, there have been some concerns raised over the topic. Some believe that social seating could lead to stalking, and others are concerned that the companies in charge of these systems will share the extracted data with third parties for profit. According to Savir, however, all of this personal information is already available to airlines if a user has "liked" their page, so using a social seating program tells airlines nothing more than they already know except for where a passenger is sitting. In addition, some companies such as KLM's Meet & Seat have promised that they won't share personal information such as this with third parties and that passengers are prohibited from using information from other passengers' profiles to infringe upon their rights. Despite these assurances, some companies are still unwilling to implement social seating programs, not just because of a lack of demand, but because they still feel that there is the potential for misuse. As Ali Bullock, Cathay Pacific's digital and social manager, stated, "It’s got to be in the interest of the passengers, and we feel there are privacy issues surrounding the idea of social seating".
