= Cases Journal =

- Discipline: Medicine
- Language: English
- Edited by: Richard Smith

Publication details
- History: 2008-2010
- Publisher: BioMed Central
- Open access: yes
- License: Creative Commons Attribution License

Standard abbreviations
- ISO 4: Cases J.

Indexing
- ISSN: 1757-1626
- OCLC no.: 234326274

Links
- Journal homepage; Online archive

Cases Journal was an open access, peer-reviewed medical journal publishing any case reports from any area of healthcare that were understandable, ethical, authentic, and included all information essential to its interpretation. The journal had no publication criteria based on the interest level of the case. The editor in chief of Cases Journal was Richard Smith. Articles that were published in Cases Journal are indexed in PubMed and archived in PubMed Central.
