= Brand networking =

Brand networking is the engagement of a social networking service around a brand by providing consumers with a platform of relevant content, elements of participation, and a currency, score, or ranking. Brand networking creates communities that serve as interactive destinations to encourage brand participation online and off. This evolved level of user participation with the brand facilitates strong relationships with consumers, leverages sales, and generates fan equity. The concept builds on the marketing literature on brand communities, which describes specialized, non-geographically bound groups of consumers organized around shared interest in a brand, and on subsequent research on social-media-based brand communities that examines how such groups operate when embedded in general-purpose networking platforms.

== History ==
The development and growth of social networking in the early 2000s gave birth to brand networking. Brands saw the immediate potential to reach and interact with consumers through online platforms like Facebook and MySpace. At first, the ability to reach consumers through these platforms was inadequate; brands had the option to join as members or simply advertise on these sites. The potential existed to not only display advertisements to consumers, but to encourage them to interact with the brand. This is when brands made the shift to create their own networking platforms. Less evolved attempts to connect brands with consumers via networking are typically built as online platforms meant only to complement a product/service and are limited in functionality. Typically these sites offer consumers the opportunity to interact through discussion boards and group pages. The Guiding Light Community was built to complement the popular CBS television soap opera. The site offers members reward points for contributing content to discussion boards and blogs (which is all geared toward the show).

== Structure ==
Brand networking is more than the utilization of a social networking platform; it is connecting consumers together and constructing relationships directly with the brand. Three key elements, in unity, create effective brand networking: relevant content, elements of participation, and a competitive currency.

- Websites in conjunction with other media types (television, radio, print) present content around a vertical industry, sector of interest, or cultural and social issues for a brand. This can be in areas such as health, marketing, or business, or any content relevant to the brand message. Such content is not only provided by the brand but also in the form of consumer-generated media. Research on brand-related user-generated content across major platforms suggests that the form and tone of consumer contributions vary by platform, with promotional content more common on some networks and response-oriented content on others.
- A brand provides participation with consumers online and offline. This is accomplished through the combination of typical social networking features online, such as personalised pages, friend lists, groups, and messaging, alongside elements of involvement offline. This is not simply connecting an online platform with mobile devices, but providing separate mobile features jointly with a secondary media type to drive online usage and build relationships with the brand on the go. By participating in mobile campaigns, users are interacting with the brand outside of traditional brick and mortar or e-commerce destinations. Empirical work on consumer brand engagement in social media frames such participation along cognitive, affective, and behavioural dimensions.
- The final element of brand networking involves incentivising participation with the other two elements. The addition of a currency or point system acts as an anchor to the brand and network and creates a competitive dynamic between consumers. These points are distributed for activity carried out outside of the networking site. By incentivising usage offline, the brand image is reinforced for the consumer and strengthens the relationship. Consumers are turned into promoters for both the brand and the users' benefit. The use of points, badges, leaderboards, and similar mechanics is described in the marketing literature as gamification, and has been linked to higher participation rates in mobile and loyalty programmes.

== Fan equity ==
Fan equity is the idea that by locking in consumers to a brand, they are turned into fans of the brand. As fans, they promote, interact, and consume on a daily basis and become assets. Apple Inc. is one example of a company often cited as possessing fan equity. Customers of Apple are extremely brand loyal and are assets to the company.

Creating a fan-generated brand is a difficult but effective method of business. Through the use of brand networking, a company is able to build a consumer or fan base that provides a strong relationship between business and consumers. The trust is formed and fans do a lot of work for the brand by word of mouth. Peer-to-peer channels are the strongest means of communication for a brand, but also one in which the brand can only influence and not control. Subsequent research links community engagement with brand trust, identifying community engagement as a mediator between social-media brand community participation and trust.

This method of business is argued to be a relationship handled by the brand generally for its own gain. Many fans do not realise the work they are doing for companies by using their product or service. Facebook is a fan-based brand that has become a global phenomenon through customer use, with social media features such as sharing and commenting.

With the growth of social media, marketing and advertising through social media has continued to expand. Brands can display and promote their products or services at a fast rate, with consumers sharing and contributing to the brand on a global scale. This can also be seen as online word of mouth exposure that can produce positive or negative feedback for brands.

Once consumers become fans they are typically loyal, which can create positive word of mouth for a brand. Fans become a valuable asset, boosting the status and reputation of a brand. Different perceptions of brands can be linked to a person's origin or religion, which creates a difficulty when trying to enter a market or gain market share. Businesses need to be aware of the types of products or services they introduce to a specific market, ensuring they are culturally sensitive.

Fan pages are created on social media to maintain the relationship between brands and consumers. By engaging and interacting with consumers, brands obtain fans and produce positive imaging. Some fans become attached to brands and are often encouraged to remain as fans through the use of celebrities endorsing the brand. Research on parasocial interaction in social-media environments suggests that one-sided emotional bonds that consumers form with endorsers and brand personae help convert ordinary followers into engaged fans.
