= Qoves =

American telemedicine company

QOVES
- Type: Private
- Industry: Biotechnology
- Founded: 2019; 7 years ago
- Founder: Shafee Hassan; Leo Olsen Guillot
- Headquarters: Delaware, United States
- Area served: Worldwide
- Products: Biotechnology; analytics
- Website: www.qoves.com

Qoves is an American biotechnology company based in Delaware. Established in 2024 by Shafee Hassan and Leo Olsen Guillot, the company develops facial diagnostic tools using computer vision and artificial intelligence for its users to assess their facial features based on aesthetic research. Founded in Sydney, the company operates a YouTube channel with nearly 1 million subscribers, which publishes videos on facial aesthetics including the analysis of various celebrities.

Vogue describes QOVES as a "facial aesthetics consulting" company.

== History ==
Shafee Hassan, an engineer and anthropologist, began researching facial attractiveness with computer vision in 2019. He founded a company that originally began as a photo retouching service, but later pivoted to focus on AI analyses.

From 2021 to 2023, Hassan's research into historical trends in facial attractiveness attracted widespread media coverage, including a 2021 profile from the MIT Technology Review.

QOVES was incorporated in February 2024, and that year, raised $750,000 in venture funding from Share Ventures.

== See also ==
- Computer vision
