= Nowpatient =

English health technology company

- Trade name: NowPatient
- Type: Private
- Industry: Pharmaceutical
- Founded: 1999
- Founder: Rajive Patel
- Headquarters: Coulsdon, Surrey, England
- Number of locations: 2 Sites (2025)
- Area served: United Kingdom (prescriptions); Global (prescriptions)
- Number of employees: 53
- Website: nowpatient.com

NowPatient is a Class I software as a medical device available for Apple, Android, or desktop browser that provides online pharmacy and telehealth services. The app provides users with access to NowPatient's General practitioners, AI-powered health tools, Drug coupon, health information, medication reminders, treatments, management of chronic health conditions and continuous monitoring for health risks. Services are available in the UK and US.

It is licensed by the UK's Medicines and Healthcare products Regulatory Agency (MHRA)

== NowPatient ==
NowPatient is a health technology company based in Coulsdon, London. NowPatient is owned by Infohealth Ltd, a licensed online pharmacy, that is located in Harrow, London.

NowPatient's virtual care platform was being trialed by five groups of National Health Service (NHS) practices and one additional large practice.

The app may help overstretched NHS services.

NowPatient has integrated remote blood pressure readings into its virtual care platform allowing clinicians to prescribe more NHS and private medications remotely.

NowPatient is approved by the NHS to provide online services for patients registered with a GP surgery in England to access a range of online health and prescription services.

== History ==
Now Healthcare Group was a health technology company founded in 2014 and based in Salford. It was formally dissolved on 12 November 2023 after having entered into administration in May 2020, following the loss of its Aviva contract.

It was approved by the Care Quality Commission and was said to have 20 million customers.

Now Healthcare Group Ltd is dissolved and no longer an entity.

It provided digital GP services to Aviva clients, using its mobile app, Aviva Digital GP, which allowed people to book video consultations with a GP, get remote diagnoses and advice on simple medical queries.

This service was already offered to the company's private medical insurance clients.

Now Healthcare Group also employed its own GPs.

Now Pharmacy, in Liverpool, was a "tele-pharmacy super hub". It was able dispense around 500,000 prescriptions per month. It used robotics technology, called Rowa and made by Becton, Dickinson.

NowPatient was acquired by Infohealth Ltd in May 2020, and redeveloped into an AI-driven accessible platform that relieves the burden on physical healthcare providers and broadens access to vital services.
