= Clixtr =

Startup company based in San Francisco, California

Clixtr Inc., later Focal Labs, was a startup company based in San Francisco, California.

Clixtr was a location-based service photo sharing platform which allows its users to create geo-tagged events and upload mobile photos to those events in real time. Multiple users are able to upload their photos to one event. Because Clixtr uses the iPhone GPS, Clixtr users create instant, location-aware, group photo albums which nearby users can contribute their own photos to.

Focal Labs was acquired by RadiumOne in December 2011.
