= GSBA Zurich =

- Official logo

Information
- Founded: 1968

The Graduate School of Business Administration Zurich (GSBA Zurich) was a business school in Switzerland with several international collaborations (USA, UK, China, South Africa). The flagships were an international and a global MBA.

The school was founded in 1968 as "Oekreal Management Zentrum," offering Swiss professional degrees.

In July 2009 Peter Lorange, former IMD president, bought GSBA Zurich.
