= Attend Anywhere =

Health video conferencing tool

AttendAnywhere
- Founded: 1998
- Founder: Chris Ryan
- Headquarters: Melbourne
- Website: https://www.attendanywhere.com/

Attend Anywhere is a web-based video conferencing tool which is used to provide video consultations to patients and service users through virtual clinics known as 'waiting rooms'. It is produced by a not-for-profit organisation within the Australian public health sector based in Melbourne. It is used as part of health-sector or government-coordinated video consulting programmes but is not available for contracts with healthcare providers on an individual basis. In Australia, it is available free-of-charge to Australian public hospitals and to most charities and not-for-profit organisations.

The COVID-19 pandemic in England spurred radical shifts to video appointments as most routine outpatient appointments were cancelled. Attend Anywhere was installed across NHS organisations in England in March 2020 with backing from NHSX and by May 2020 had been used for more than 79,000 consultations. A freedom of information request answered by NHS Improvement on 23 Jun 2020 revealed that "The national video outpatient consultation contract, in response to the COVID-19 pandemic, was procured under G-Cloud 11 and was awarded to Attend Anywhere for up to £4.85m ex VAT and runs from 17 March 2020 – 16 March 2021." It was already widely used in Scotland and Wales. The system allows patients to see a clinician via a secure, pre-arranged video call. Patients can use a computer, smartphone or tablet.

The software has enabled four times as many virtual contacts to face-to-face contacts in community stroke and acquired brain injury teams in South Wales.

In March 2022 NHS Scotland and the Scottish Government have renewed their contracts for another year. In Scotland it is branded as Near Me. It now includes clinical group consultations. Between January 2021 and January 2022, over 985,000 Near Me video consultations were conducted, avoiding about 47 million miles of patient travel.
