= LifeMD =

American telehealth company

LifeMD, Inc.
- Trade name: LFMD
- Formerly: ImmuDyne, Inc. Conversion Labs, Inc.
- Company type: Public
- Industry: Telehealth
- Founded: May 24, 1994; 32 years ago in New York City, United States
- Key people: Justin Schreiber, CEO; Bobby Jindal, Board member
- Website: lifemd.com

LifeMD, Inc. is a publicly traded American telehealth company. It gives subscribers access to doctors and nurse practitioners for virtual medical consultations and treatments with prescription medications.

== History ==
The company was founded as ImmuDyne, Inc. in 1994 and completed its initial public offering in 2001. In 2018, it rebranded as Conversion Labs, Inc. with Justin Schreiber named chief executive officer. The company changed its name to LifeMD in 2020 and started using the ticker name LFMD.

In the first quarter of 2025, LifeMD reported that total revenues increased 49% YoY to $65.7 million.

== Services ==
In September 2022, LifeMD named former Louisiana governor Bobby Jindal to its board of directors.

In June 2023, LifeMD announced a weight management program to prescribe GLP-1 medications upon meeting requirements in a virtual appointment with a clinician. It began a pilot program with Medifast, which later announced a partnership between the companies to connect each other's customers. LifeMD also received a $20 million investment from Medifast at that time.

The company introduced private health insurance acceptance in 2024.

In March 2025, LifeMD signed an agreement to offer Eli Lilly’s weight-loss drug Zepbound to self-paying patients. Specifically, a deal was signed with LillyDirect’s pharmacy partner, through which vials of Zepbound are sold at discounts for cash-pay customers. LifeMD’s stock surged in 2025 after a deal with Novo Nordisk to offer Wegovy through the LifeMD platform at a discounted price.

In April 2025, LifeMD acquired women’s health virtual care provider Optimal Human Health MD, to establish a foundation of hormone health, metabolism, and bone density on its platform.
