= Goodwall =

Social network

Goodwall SA
- Logo since 2019
- Founded: January 7, 2014; 12 years ago in Geneva, Switzerland
- Founder: Taha Bawa (CEO), Omar Bawa (COO)
- Headquarters: Geneva, Switzerland
- Number of employees: 50+

Goodwall App
- Original authors: Omar Bawa; Taha Bawa
- Developer: Goodwall SA
- Initial release: January 7, 2014; 12 years ago
- Operating system: iOS, Android
- Type: Social networking service

Goodwall is an app that aims to provide young people with opportunities to develop their skills and access educational and work-related opportunities. The platform is designed primarily for the Gen Z demographic and allows members to create a digital profile to showcase their skills and achievements using photos and videos. Users are encouraged to engage in skills-based challenges and online programs focusing on transferable skills such as problem-solving, creativity, and communication. The Goodwall app is available on both iOS and Android.

== History ==
Goodwall's social networking platform was founded by Omar and Taha Bawa, two brothers from Geneva, Switzerland. They were raised in a family firmly committed to humanitarian work, with their parents serving the UNHCR and The Global Fund. They later stated that these experiences inspired them to create the platform.

The idea for Goodwall stemmed from End Ignorance, a blog created by Omar Bawa in 2012 to bring attention to various global crises. The Bawa brothers expanded the blog into a social network, launched as a website in January 2014, and later developed into a mobile-first platform in 2015. It is headquartered in Geneva.

It was incubated at the MassChallenge startup accelerator. It has secured over $16 million in funding and received support from Randstad NV, and Manixer, a private equity firm focusing on education.

Initially aimed at students from high school to university, Goodwall has since broadened its focus to include entrepreneurs and young professionals. The platform attracts members from diverse socioeconomic backgrounds and countries, with an average age range of 16–26. In December 2019, the Android version of the Goodwall app achieved 1,000,000 downloads, while in early June 2020, the Goodwall community surpassed 1.5 million members. As of 2023, Goodwall has more than 2 million members across 150 countries, with its fastest-growing region being Africa.

The company also grants small scholarships to specific users.

== Services ==
=== Mobile app ===
The Goodwall app provides an alternative to traditional curriculum vitae where users can showcase their skills and achievements through photos and videos on a digital profile. Additionally, the app offers online programs and challenges to develop skills and connect with users who have similar interests. Users can communicate through the chat feature and interact with each other’s posts via commenting and upvoting. The platform aims to connect users with opportunities related to education and work, such as jobs, internships, courses, scholarships, and volunteer work.

=== Blog ===
Goodwall’s blog was relaunched in late 2019 with an updated design and visuals. The blog focuses on topics of interest to students and young professionals, including entrepreneurship, academia, job searching, careers, social impact, climate change, scholarships, and personal motivation.

== Partnerships ==
Goodwall collaborates with a range of companies, organizations, and governments to develop programs intended to enhance the skills and mobilization of young people. Some of the company's partners include UNICEF, Generation Unlimited, GIZ, Yoma, Randstad NV, and SAP. Some universities also use Goodwall as a recruiting tool to assess potential students.

In 2022, Goodwall, with the support of Stratline, Converge, and UNESCO's Goodwill Ambassador and First Lady of Cameroon, Mrs Chantal Biya, delivered an 8-week program focusing on skill development, entrepreneurial thinking, and environmental awareness. The program aimed to empower the youth of Cameroon by exposing them to various challenges related to entrepreneurship, motivation, sustainability, and gender equality.

In 2023, Goodwall partnered with Nation Media Group (NMG) in East Africa to conduct programs that engage young people in sustainability, education, health, and the environment.

Emurgo, the official commercial arm and a founding member of the Cardano block-chain, announced its collaboration with Goodwall in February 2023. Emurgo intends to facilitate Goodwall's growth into a Web3 service that utilizes Cardano's environmentally-friendly block-chain, to connect young people with the global economy.

Goodwall announced its expansion into Nigeria in 2023, thanks to its partnership with TecBlu, a Nigerian one-stop technology services company.

== Awards and recognition ==
Due to its growth and positive mission, Goodwall has received coverage in various media outlets, including the Wall Street Journal, Forbes, Inc. Magazine, The Next Web, and the University Herald.

In September 2019, Venturelab recognized Goodwall as one of Switzerland's best scale-ups. Taha and Omar Bawa, the founders of Goodwall, have been recognized by numerous organizations, including the World Economic Forum, the United Nations, Forbes 30 under 30, CNN, TEDx, and Google.
