= Weight Wins =

British weight loss company

- Company type: Private
- Founded: London, UK
- Headquarters: London, {{{location_country}}}
- Area served: International
- Founder: Winton G. Rossiter
- Services: Weight loss/diet rewards
- Website: www.weightwins.com
- Launched: 2008

Weight Wins was a UK weight loss business which developed and commercialised the concept of personal contracts for weight loss. The company attracted attention from UK and international media for its 'Pounds for Pounds' weight loss programme and for operating the first trial by the UK's National Health Service (NHS) of a weight loss incentive programme. The diet rewards sector addressed the specific problem of overweight and obesity. As with many commercial diet plans, there was no good evidence it is helpful or cost-effective. The company was dissolved in 2016.

== History ==
Weight Wins' was first devised in 2007 following a UK-wide consumer survey. The initial scheme was developed and trialled as the 'Pounds for Pounds' programme over a three-month period from September to December 2007, with a maximum weight loss target of 15 lbs.

== See also ==
- Obesity in the United Kingdom
- Dieting
- List of diets
