= Amazon Clinic =

American online health clinic

- Type: Subsidiary
- Industry: Health care
- Founded: November 15, 2022; 3 years ago
- Fate: Merged with One Medical
- Successor: Amazon One Medical
- Area served: United States
- Services: Online clinic
- Parent: Amazon
- Website: clinic.amazon.com

Amazon Clinic was an Amazon subsidiary that provided virtual healthcare services, until being merged with the company's in-person healthcare subsidiary One Medical.

== History ==
Launched in November 2022, it is available to persons aged 18 to 64, in all 50 states and Washington, DC. Customers in 34 states can use messaging to consult a medical clinician about 20 common conditions, such as acne, pink eye, migraine, and erectile dysfunction. Once the consultation is complete, patients have the option of filling any prescriptions through Amazon Pharmacy for home delivery.

From August 1, 2023, Amazon Clinic will allow video visits nationwide. Amazon Clinic uses third-party vendors and does not currently accept health insurance, instead charging a flat fee. Customers will also be able to see their medical cost before any visit. Privacy advocates have raised concerns about Amazon's potential misuse of customer's medical information.

On June 27, 2024, Amazon announced that it would merge Amazon Clinic with One Medical, a face-to-face medical service provider it acquired in 2023, and rename the business Amazon One Medical.
