= Doxy.me =

Telemedicine platform

Doxy.me (pronounced "doc-see-me") is a web-based telemedicine platform designed specifically for healthcare providers to conduct video consultations with patients. Doxy.me is known for its simplicity and ease of use.

== History ==
Doxy.me was founded in 2013 by Brandon Welch while he was a PhD student in Biomedical Informatics at the University of Utah. The platform was initially developed to provide a simple and free, HIPAA-compliant telemedicine app for obstetricians to use in a remote prenatal care study. At the time, there were no available solutions that met these criteria, so Welch, along with fellow student Dylan Turner, built the first version of doxy.me using the newly released WebRTC framework. Much of the early development of doxy.me was funded by winning several student innovation awards, including "Best Business Plan" in the 2014 Utah Entrepreneur Challenge.

Launched to the public in 2014, doxy.me experienced steady growth reaching 80,000 healthcare providers by the start of 2020. The COVID-19 pandemic significantly accelerated the platform's adoption, with the number of users growing to 700,000 within two months. As of 2024, approximately 1.3 million healthcare providers worldwide have conducted over 400 million sessions on doxy.me, accounting for nearly 10 billion minutes of telehealth. Doxy.me is widely adopted across various healthcare settings.

== Features ==
Doxy.me is popular among healthcare providers due to its simplicity, quick implementation, clinical workflows, and availability of free and low-cost versions. Doxy.me offers a set of features that replicate clinical workflows in a remote environment, including:

- Video Conferencing: Secure, private real-time video meetings between healthcare providers and patients.
- Patient Check-In: A streamlined process allowing patients to check in for their appointments.
- Patient Queue: A system to manage multiple patients, similar to a traditional waiting room queue.
- Virtual Waiting Room: A virtual space where patients wait for their consultation, with options for custom branding.
- Patient Transfer: Allows seamless transfer of patients between different healthcare providers within the platform.
- Custom Branding: Options for healthcare providers to customize the platform's interface to reflect their brand identity.

In addition to these core features, doxy.me offers apps that extend its functionality including teleconsent, a feature developed with NIH SBIR funding, screenshare, whiteboard, file transfer, payments.

== Privacy and security ==
Doxy.me takes a data-lean approach to privacy and security. The platform does not collect or store patient health information, only the healthcare provider knows the patient's identity, which ensures patient privacy and security through anonymity. This approach, combined with compliance with HIPAA, GDPR, and HITECH regulations, makes doxy.me a trusted platform for secure telehealth consultations. HIPAA compliance is included in the free version.

== Related activities ==
One study found that nationwide use of doxy.me in 2021-2022 resulted in an approximate annual CO_{2} emissions savings of 1,443,800 metric tons.

Founder and CEO, Brandon M Welch, MS, PhD, co-authored the book Telehealth Success: How to Thrive in the New Age of Remote Care.

== See also ==
- Telehealth
- Telemedicine service providers
