= Troxell =

Troxell is a surname. Notable people with the surname include:

- John Troxell, American football coach and former player
- John W. Troxell (born c. 1964), former Senior Enlisted Advisor to the Chairman of the Joint Chief of Staffs
- Richard Troxell, American operatic tenor

== See also ==
- Troxell-Steckel House
