= Phreesia =

Healthcare technology company

Phreesia Inc.
- Type: Public
- Traded as: NYSE: PHR
- Industry: Health Care Information Technology
- Founded: 2005
- Headquarters: Wilmington, Delaware, U.S.
- Key people: Chaim Indig; Evan Roberts; Michael Weintraub
- Revenue: ▲US$481 million (2025)
- Net income: ▲US$2.31 million (2025)
- Website: phreesia.com

Phreesia, Inc. is a software as a service company that offers healthcare organizations a set of applications to automate and manage patient intake.

== Information ==
Headquartered in Wilmington, Delaware, Phreesia employs approximately 1400 people across the United States and Canada. Phreesia was founded in January 2005 by CEO Chaim Indig and COO Evan Roberts. Michael Weintraub has remained chairman of the company's board since its founding. Phreesia develops patient intake and "digital engagement" solutions.

On July 18, 2019, Phreesia (PHR) completed its initial public offering and is listed on the New York Stock Exchange (NYSE).

In 2021, Phreesia acquired schedule-management solution QueueDr, now offered to Phreesia clients as Appointment Accelerator. In December 2021, it also announced the acquisition of Insignia Health, licensor of the Patient Activation Measure. In August 2023, it was announced that Phreesia had acquired the Sulphur Springs-headquartered electronic forms management and automation provider Access eForms for an undisclosed amount.
