= Patient Activation Measure =

Health survey

The Patient Activation Measure (PAM) is a commercial product which assesses an individual's knowledge, skill, and confidence for managing one's health and healthcare. Individuals who measure high on this assessment typically understand the importance of taking a pro-active role in managing their health and have the skills and confidence to do so.

The PAM survey measures patients on a 0–100 scale and can segment patients into one of four activation levels along an empirically derived continuum. Each activation level reveals insight into an array of health-related characteristics, including attitudes, motivators, behaviors, and outcomes.

== Development and science ==
PAM was developed using qualitative methods, Rasch analysis, and classical test theory psychometric methods. Developed by Judith Hibbard and colleagues at the University of Oregon, the resulting 13-item measure is a uni-dimensional, interval level, Guttman-like scale. The PAM has strong psychometric properties, and has been translated into 22 different languages. The measure is currently used to assess patient activation or engagement by researchers and healthcare organizations around the world. PAM is licensed exclusively through healthcare technology company Phreesia following the acquisition of its original licensor, Insignia Health, in December 2021.

There are a number of instruments measuring similar constructs, including My Health Confidence, Patient Health Engagement Scale, Stanford self-efficacy for managing chronic disease 6-item scale, ICECAP-A (the ICEpop CAPability measure for Adults), the Health Literacy Questionnaire and the Health Confidence Score.

== Research ==
Multiple studies show that PAM scores are predictive of most health behaviors, including preventive behaviors (e.g. obtaining screenings and immunizations); healthy behaviors (e.g. healthy diet and regular exercise); self-management behaviors (e.g. monitoring and medication management); and health information seeking. Higher activated individuals also have better health outcomes and lower rates of costly utilization, such as emergency department use and hospitalizations.

Further there is evidence that with support and appropriate interventions it is possible to increase activation levels in patients. In patients with inflammatory arthritis, patient activation has been shown to be associated with self-efficacy, the illness beliefs about treatment, and health literacy. This suggests that these predictors of patient activation could act as targets for intervention in this group of patients.

The Patient Activation Measure is being used in a number of ways to improve the delivery of health care, including:

- a metric to assess the degree to which patients are prepared and able to self-manage
- to tailor support and education to help patients increase in activation
- to track the impact of interventions and tailored support on increasing patient activation levels
- to segment an enrolled patient population, and direct more resources to low activated patients (a more efficient use of resources )
- to use in population health management
- to use in predictive modeling, by using both PAM scores and clinical data, it is possible to identify future high risk/high cost patients more accurately than just using clinical data
