= ForAfrika =

Humanitarian organisation in Africa

- Formation: 1984
- Founder: Peter Pretorius & Ann Pretorius
- Type: Humanitarian & Development NGO
- Headquarters: Johannesburg, South Africa
- Region served: Africa
- Fields: Humanitarian Aid, Development, Activism
- Group CEO: Isak Pretorius
- Staff: 1,000
- Website: https://www.forafrika.org
- Formerly called: Joint Aid Management (JAM)

ForAfrika is an African-led humanitarian and development organisation, originally established as Joint Aid Management (JAM) in 1984. It is the largest African humanitarian organisation, focusing on food security, healthcare, education, and emergency response across the continent.

== History ==
ForAfrika was founded by Peter and Ann Pretorius in response to a severe famine in Mozambique. The organisation initially provided emergency food relief and has since expanded to include broader community development initiatives. The organisation now works in eight African Countries – Angola, Central African Republic, Ethiopia, Mozambique, Rwanda, South Africa, South Sudan, and Uganda.

== Key areas of work ==
ForAfrika works in five core areas. These include:

- Emergency response: Provides aid to communities during disasters or conflicts, including food, water, shelter, and medical care.
- Water, Sanitation and Hygiene: Access to clean water and sanitation facilities and promotes hygiene practices.
- Food Security, and livelihoods: Access to nutritious food and supports sustainable agriculture and income-generating activities.
- Education: Provides educational opportunities through school construction, provision of materials, and teacher training.
- Health and nutrition: Offers healthcare services and education on nutrition to improve community health.
