= HealthyWage =

Health and wellness company

- Company type: Private
- Founded: New York, New York, USA
- Headquarters: Coral Gables, Florida, {{{location_country}}}
- Founders: David Roddenberry; Jimmy Fleming
- Website: healthywage.com
- Launched: 2009

HealthyWage is a for-profit health and wellness company that provides weight loss and fitness challenges with cash prizes. The company is noted for pushing public discussion on health incentive issues, and for launching programs that use various combinations of cash prizes, financial commitment, social motivation and positive peer pressure to achieve weight loss and fitness results at the corporate and consumer levels.

== History ==
HealthyWage was founded in 2009 in New York City by former healthcare consultant David Roddenberry and his colleague Jimmy Fleming. The company launched its website later that year at TechCrunch in San Francisco. In January 2010, the company became the first in the United States to offer cash weight loss incentives directly to consumers.

== Activities ==
HealthyWage's first program, the BMI Challenge, paid Americans who moved in one year from an obese BMI to a normal BMI. The 10% Challenge, which followed later that year, allowed participants to commit $150 and win $300 if they lost 10% of their weight over six months. These two programs have since been consolidated into the HealthyWager in which each participant creates a customized weight loss "bet."

== Services ==
HealthyWage develops programming based on academic and industry research on the impact of financial incentives and social networking on the effectiveness of wellness program outcomes. HealthyWage programs are available directly to consumers and also through many large employers, including Fortune 500 companies, school districts, state and local governments and other employers.

HealthyWager

The HealthyWager program allows participants to "bet" on their weight loss. Each participant uses the HealthyWager prize calculator to find out what cash prize HealthyWage will pay based on how much the participant is willing to "wager," how much weight the participant wants to lose, and how much time the participant needs to reach that weight loss goal. Participants who achieve their goal in the agreed timeframe win the prize. The model provides a double incentivization in the form of loss aversion and the opportunity to gain.

Step Challenges

HealthyWage Step Challenges use activity-tracking devices to allow individuals and teams to compete for cash prizes and to increase their physical activity. Participants each pay a fee into the "pot" at the beginning of the challenge. Participants that meet their activity goal by the end of the challenge (typically by increasing their average daily steps by a given percentage) win an equal share of the pot.

Jackpot Challenges

HealthyWage Jackpot Challenges are weight loss competitions in which individuals and teams (generally 4 to 9 teammates) compete to lose a set percentage of their body weight by the end of the challenge. Each participant pays a fee into the "pot" at the beginning of the challenge. At the end of the challenge, all of the successful participants and/or teams win an equal share of the pot.

$10,000 Team Challenge

The $10,000 Team Challenge is a weight loss competition in which teams of five use teamwork and tools to lose weight over a period of time (usually 90 days). HealthyWage pays a large prize to the participants with the greatest percentage weight loss. The team wins as a group, so every team member has a stake in every other team member's success.

== Effectiveness ==
Weight loss and fitness competitions reflect a broader trend in consumer and corporate fitness around using games and money to provide accountability and motivation for health-related activities ranging from weight loss to regular gym use, healthy eating and smoking cessation. A study published in the Journal of the American Medical Association found that those with a financial incentive to lose weight were almost three times more likely to reach their target than dieters with no money at stake.
