= Medifast =

American multi-level marketing company

Medifast, Inc.
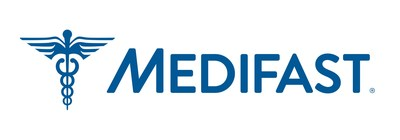
- Type: Public
- Traded as: NYSE: MED
- Industry: Weight loss, multi-level marketing
- Founded: 1981
- Headquarters: Baltimore, Maryland, United States
- Key people: Daniel R. Chard, Executive Chairman and CEO
- Products: Optavia; Medifast diet (retired 2021)
- Revenue: ▲US$ 934.8 million (2020), US$1,526,087 (2021), US$1,598,577 (2022)
- Operating income: ▲US$ 134.2 million (2020)
- Net income: ▲US$ 102.9 million (2020)
- Total assets: ▲US$ 276.1 million (2020)
- Total equity: ▲US$ 157.2 million (2020)
- Number of employees: 380 (2025)
- Website: medifastinc.com

Medifast, Inc. (NYSE: MED) is an American nutrition and weight loss company based in Baltimore, Maryland. Medifast produces, distributes, and sells weight loss and health-related products through websites, multi-level marketing, telemarketing, and franchised weight loss clinics.

== Subsidiaries ==
The company owns five subsidiaries:

- Jason Pharmaceuticals, Inc.
- Take Shape for Life, Inc. (TSFL) (renamed Optavia from July 2017)
- Jason Enterprises, Inc.
- Jason Properties, LLC
- Seven Crondall, LLC

== History ==
William Vitale, a medical doctor, founded Medifast in 1980. He sold his products directly to other doctors, who in turn prescribed them to their patients alongside behavioural counselling techniques.

The company is publicly traded on the New York Stock Exchange (symbol: MED).

On July 17, 1995, HealthRite (predecessor of Medifast) changed its name from Vitamin Specialties Corp.

In 2000 the company pivoted to a direct-to-consumer marketing program with the help of Jason Pharmaceuticals and in 2001, the company changed its name to Medifast, Inc. In 2002, Retired Marine Colonel Bradley T. MacDonald, Chairman of the Board at the time, along with clinical specialist Dr. Wayne Scott Andersen, created Take Shape For Life as a personal Coach to the Client system and the company's “Habits of Health System.”

In October 2010, Medifast was ranked number 1 on Forbes magazine's list of "America's 100 Best Small Companies". The company was ranked 18th on the 2014 list.

Medifast was named one of Forbes's 100 Most Trustworthy Companies in America in 2016 and 2017.

In July 2017, Medifast changed the name of its subsidiary Take Shape For Life to Optavia and introduced a new line of products, Optavia Essentials, directly sold from Coaches to clients.

In October 2017, Medifast relocated its headquarters to Baltimore from Owings Mills, Maryland. The company is public with a market capitalization of $2.106 billion, as of June 2022.

In December 2023, Medifast announced a partnership with LifeMD, a provider of virtual healthcare services. Under the agreement, Medifast will use LifeMD's virtual platform to offer Medifast clients a clinically supported weight management program, including the option for prescription GLP-1 medications where clinically appropriate. In return, LifeMD will provide its patients with an independent Medifast Coach and additional lifestyle support services for weight management.

== False advertising settlement ==
In September 2012, Medifast's subsidiary, Jason Pharmaceuticals, paid a $3.7 million USD civil penalty for false advertising. The Federal Trade Commission and United States Department of Justice said that advertisements for the "Medifast 5 & 1 Plan" low-calorie diet told consumers they could "lose up to 2-5 pounds per week", and that these weight-loss claims lacked a reasonable scientific basis, and were unsubstantiated. Under the settlement, any future claims made by the company must be backed by at least one human clinical study.
