= Accurx =

Health software company in United Kingdom

- Type: Private
- Genre: Software company working in the health sector
- Founded: 2016
- Founder: Jacob Haddad and Laurence Bargery
- Headquarters: United Kingdom

Patient view for arranging appointments and test results.

Accurx is a British software company working in the health sector. Accurx provides messaging software that integrates with existing NHS clinical systems.

The company was co-founded by Jacob Haddad and Laurence Bargery, who met and subsequently founded the company at Entrepreneur First in 2016.

Accurx's main product is Chain SMS, a messaging program used by GP surgeries to communicate with patients. The program runs on desktop computers and sends SMS text messages. It can integrate with some software used in GP surgeries—SystmOne and EMIS Health. Chain SMS was launched in February 2018 and as of February 2019, was used in more than 1,400 GP surgeries in the UK. Since the COVID-19 pandemic in the UK, Accurx integrated a videotelephony system into Chain SMS, using Whereby, and subsequently "more than 90 percent of primary care clinics in England are now using it" for online appointments.

SMS messages from Chain SMS appear from "GPSurgery" by default.

University Hospitals of Leicester NHS Trust used Accurx's patient messaging feature in 2022 to communicate with patients via SMS to ask if they still needed their overdue first appointment or follow-up appointment. 10% said they no longer needed the service.

Its patient-centred viewing system, Record View, was launched in May 2022. It permits clinicians to view a read-only summary of a patient's GP medical record with the patient's explicit permission.

== AI scribing partnership ==
In 2025, Accurx announced a partnership with Tandem Health AI scribe to introduce an AI-powered clinical documentation tool for use within the NHS. Branded as Accurx Scribe, the product is designed to support clinicians during consultations by generating draft medical notes from patient conversations, with clinicians retaining responsibility for review and finalisation. Reporting on the rollout described the tool as part of Accurx’s broader efforts to reduce administrative burden for NHS staff while meeting existing safety and data protection requirements for clinical software.
