= Cerebral (company) =

American telehealth company

Cerebral Inc.
- Company type: Private
- Industry: Telehealth, Mental Health
- Founded: 2020
- Founder: Kyle Robertson, Ho Anh
- Key people: Kyle Robertson (co-founder and ex-CEO); Ho Anh (co-founder and Medical Director); Simone Biles (ex-Chief Impact Officer); David Mou (ex-CEO); Brian Reinken(interim CEO)
- Services: Online mental health care
- Website: cerebral.com

Cerebral Inc. is an American telehealth company that provides online mental health services, including therapy, counseling, and medication management for various mental health conditions.

== History ==
Cerebral was founded in 2020 by Kyle Robertson and Ho Anh. The company quickly scaled its operations across the United States and grew its network to include thousands of licensed clinicians.

Early on, Cerebral partnered with gymnast and Olympic gold medal winner Simone Biles as their Chief Impact Officer.

In June 2021, the company raised $127 million, and was valued at $1.2 billion. In December 2021, Cerebral raised $300 million in a Series C funding round led by SoftBank Vision Fund 2, boosting the company's valuation to approximately $4.8 billion. The round included investors such as Prysm Capital, Access Industries, and WestCap Group.

In 2022, Cerebral came under scrutiny for its prescribing practices, particularly concerning controlled substances such as Adderall. The U.S. Department of Justice (DOJ) began investigating potential violations of the Controlled Substances Act. In response, Cerebral announced that it would cease most prescriptions of controlled substances.

After Kyle Robertson's exit, in May 2022, Cerebral experienced major setbacks, including workforce reductions and strategic shifts, amid regulatory scrutiny and financial pressures. Kyle Robertson has since gone on to found Zealthy, a telemedicine company. David Mou, stepped in as CEO in mid-2022, who was formerly the company's chief medical officer.

In November 2024, Cerebral eventually agreed to pay $3.65 million to resolve the DOJ probe.

Mou stepped down as CEO in December 2024. Brian Reinken, a former board member, has since stepped in as the interim CEO.

In August 2025, Cerebral announced that it had acquired Resilience Lab, a behavioral health company focused on training early-career mental health clinicians and reducing clinician burnout and turnover.

Cerebral stated that it planned to expand Resilience Lab’s training model and protocols across its platform to improve care quality, client outcomes, and measurable results for insurance payers.

== Services ==
Cerebral provides online mental health services including therapy, psychiatric evaluations, medication management, and ongoing support. The platform uses a subscription model and employs telehealth technology to match users with licensed therapists and prescribers.

== See also ==
- Mental health in the United States
