= 2018 New York Lizards season =

Major League Lacrosse

2018 New York Lizards
- League: Major League Lacrosse
- 2018 record: 8-6
- General Manager: Joe Spallina
- Coach: Joe Spallina
- Arena: James M. Shuart Stadium

The 2018 New York Lizards season was the eighteenth season for the New York Lizards of Major League Lacrosse. The Lizards came off a down season in 2017, where they finished 7-7 and missed the playoffs for the first time in four years. In 2018, the Lizards won their last three games of the regular season, clinching the fourth seed in the postseason. However, their playoff run was short-lived as they lost to the Dallas Rattlers in the semifinal round, 15-12.

Joe Spallina enters his eighth season as head coach of the Lizards. Because Tim Soudan did not make the move with the Rattlers to Dallas, Spallina is now the longest-tenured head coach in the league.

== Offseason ==
=== Transactions ===
- September 27, 2017 - Will Manny resigns with the Lizards on a one-year contract. Manny was acquired in a controversial trade from the Boston Cannons at the trade deadline in 2017.
- October 2 - The Lizards lose attackman Matt Gibson to the Atlanta Blaze in the Player movement period. Gibson was drafted by the Lizards in 2012.
- October 12 - The Lizards acquire face-off specialist Brendan Fowler from the Charlotte Hounds in exchange for midfielder Jake Richard and a second round pick in the 2018 collegiate draft.
- January 9, 2018 - Defenseman Matt Landis is acquired from the Cannons in exchange for Ryan Walsh and Scott Firman. New York will also give up its first round pick in the supplemental draft to Boston.

== Schedule ==
=== Regular season ===
Date	Opponent	Stadium	Result	Attendance	Record
April 21	Denver Outlaws	James M. Shuart Stadium	W 19-15	3,748	1-0
April 29	at Ohio Machine	Fortress Obetz	L 13-25	3,347	1-1
May 4	at Denver Outlaws	Sports Authority Field at Mile High	L 12-16	3,444	1-2
May 6	Atlanta Blaze	James M. Shuart Stadium	L 14-16	3,218	1-3
May 19	at Florida Launch	FAU Stadium	W 14-13	2,082	2-3
June 2	at Atlanta Blaze	Fifth Third Bank Stadium	W 20-17	2,326	3-3
June 9	Florida Launch	James M. Shuart Stadium	L 18-20	5,237	3-4
June 16	Charlotte Hounds	James M. Shuart Stadium	W 20-16	5,319	4-4
June 23	at Boston Cannons	Endicott College (Beverly, MA)	L 13-15	3,468	4-5
June 30	Ohio Machine	James M. Shuart Stadium	W 15-14	5,057	5-5
July 7	at Chesapeake Bayhawks	Navy-Marine Corps Memorial Stadium	L 13-16	5,443	5-6
July 19	Boston Cannons	James M. Shuart Stadium	W 14-13	5,017	6-6
July 29	at Dallas Rattlers	The Ford Center at The Star	W 13-12	4,712	7-6
August 4	Chesapeake Bayhawks	James M. Shuart Stadium	W 18-11	5,315	8-6

== Postseason ==
=== Postseason ===
Date	Round	Opponent	Stadium	Result	Attendance
August 11	Semifinal	at Dallas Rattlers	The Ford Center at The Star	L, 12-15	6,124

== Standings ==
2018 Major League Lacrosse Standings
	W	L	PCT	GB	GF	2ptGF	GA	2ptGA
Dallas Rattlers	11	3	.786	-	201	8	175	2
Chesapeake Bayhawks	9	5	.643	2	176	11	174	7
Denver Outlaws	8	6	.571	3	225	5	183	14
New York Lizards	8	6	.571	3	211	5	214	5
Charlotte Hounds	7	7	.500	4	196	8	191	4
Atlanta Blaze	7	7	.500	4	187	10	184	7
Boston Cannons	5	9	.357	6	173	9	213	9
Florida Launch	5	9	.357	6	192	4	201	10
Ohio Machine	3	11	.214	8	173	6	199	8

Playoff Seed
