= 2018 Denver Outlaws season =

2018 Denver Outlaws
- League: Major League Lacrosse
- 2018 record: 8-6
- General Manager: Tony Seaman
- Coach: B.J. O'Hara
- Arena: Sports Authority Field at Mile High

The 2018 Denver Outlaws season was the thirteenth season for the Denver Outlaws of Major League Lacrosse. The Denver Outlaws were coming off a 9-5 2017 season in which they finished in first place. They made it back to the league championship game, but lost for the fifth time in seven trips. This time, they lost a 2016 Steinfeld Cup rematch with the Ohio Machine, surrendering seven unanswered goals in the fourth quarter for a 17-12 defeat. However, the Outlaws came into 2018 with an 8-6 record and having won titles in back-to-back even-numbered years.

== Offseason ==
- November 14, 2017 - Assistant general manager and coach Jon Cohen was promoted to Director of Player Personnel, but continued his duties as assistant coach and assistant general manager. Cohen has been with the team for 11 of the franchise's 12 seasons.

== Regular season ==
- July 4 - In their inaugural Fourth of July Game, the Outlaws defend home field with a 25-11 victory over the Boston Cannons in front of 29,973 fans, the fourth largest attendance in league history.

=== Schedule ===
Date	Opponent	Stadium	Result	Attendance	Record
April 21	at New York Lizards	James M. Shuart Stadium	L 15-19	3,748	0-1
April 29	at Dallas Rattlers	The Ford Center at The Star	L 14-15 (OT)	7,217	0-2
May 4	New York Lizards	Sports Authority Field at Mile High	W 16-12	3,444	1-2
May 6	at Florida Launch	FAU Stadium	L 7-16	2,406	1-3
May 13	Chesapeake Bayhawks	Sports Authority Field at Mile High	L 22-24	1,788	1-4
May 19	Charlotte Hounds	Sports Authority Field at Mile High	W 17-13	2,665	2-4
June 2	at Charlotte Hounds	American Legion Memorial Stadium	W 16-13	1,469	3-4
June 7	Ohio Machine	Sports Authority Field at Mile High	W 17-6	6,388	4-4
June 16	Florida Launch	Sports Authority Field at Mile High	W 26-15	4,734	5-4
June 23	at Ohio Machine	Fortress Obetz	W 17-13	2,226	6-4
July 4	Boston Cannons	Sports Authority Field at Mile High	W 25-11	29,973	7-4
July 22	Dallas Rattlers	Sports Authority Field at Mile High	L 12-13	5,316	7-5
July 28	at Chesapeake Bayhawks	Navy-Marine Corps Memorial Stadium	L 11-13	5,149	7-6
August 4	at Atlanta Blaze	Fifth Third Bank Stadium	W 15-14	2,204	8-6

=== Postseason ===
Date	Round	Opponent	Stadium	Result	Attendance
August 11	Semifinal	at Chesapeake Bayhawks	Navy-Marine Corps Memorial Stadium	W 13-12	2,977
August 18	Steinfeld Cup	Dallas Rattlers	MUSC Health Stadium (Charleston, SC)	W 16-12	4,086

== Standings ==
2018 Major League Lacrosse Standings
	W	L	PCT	GB	GF	2ptGF	GA	2ptGA
Dallas Rattlers	11	3	.786	-	201	8	175	2
Chesapeake Bayhawks	9	5	.643	2	176	11	174	7
Denver Outlaws	8	6	.571	3	225	5	183	14
New York Lizards	8	6	.571	3	211	5	214	5
Charlotte Hounds	7	7	.500	4	196	8	191	4
Atlanta Blaze	7	7	.500	4	187	10	184	7
Boston Cannons	5	9	.357	6	173	9	213	9
Florida Launch	5	9	.357	6	192	4	201	10
Ohio Machine	3	11	.214	8	173	6	199	8

Playoff Seed
