= 2018 Boston Cannons season =

2018 Boston Cannons
- League: Major League Lacrosse
- 2018 record: 5-9
- General Manager: Ian Frenette
- Coach: Sean Quirk
- Arena: Harvard Stadium

The 2018 Boston Cannons season was the eighteenth season for the Boston Cannons of Major League Lacrosse. The Cannons entered the season looking to improve upon their franchise-worst and last place 3-11 record in 2017. They did so after winning their last two games of the season, finishing 5-9. The record earned them seventh place in the league standings.

== Offseason ==
- December 6, 2017 - The Cannons announce a "Cannons in Your Community" initiative and will play two regular season home games at Endicott College in Beverly, Massachusetts and one game at Hingham High School in Hingham, Massachusetts.
- December 14 - Former MLL player Ben Rubeor is hired as offensive coordinator for the 2018 season.
- February 8, 2018 - The Cannons agree to a five-year partnership with Camas Lacrosse of Camas, Washington to field a club lacrosse program. The team, called the Columbia Cannons, will have access to use all of the Cannons' trademarks. The Cannons and Camas Lacrosse will work to host two special events in either Washington or Oregon during the season.
- April 18 - With the first pick in the 2018 Collegiate Draft, the Cannons select faceoff specialist Trevor Baptiste from the University of Denver.

=== Transactions ===
- January 11, 2018 - The Cannons acquire midfielder Ryan Walsh from the New York Lizards in exchange for Matt Landis. The Cannons also receive Scott Firman and the fifth overall pick in the January 2018 Supplemental Draft.
- February 14 - The Cannons and Max Seibald agree to a one-year contract through the 2018 season.

== Regular season ==
=== Transactions ===
- May 30 - Per request, attackman Davey Emala is traded from Boston to the Ohio Machine in exchange for midfielder Mark Cockerton and a seventh round draft pick in the 2019 collegiate draft.
- May 31 - Faceoff specialist Joe Nardella is traded from the Cannons to the Atlanta Blaze in exchange for second round draft pick in 2019.

=== Schedule ===
==== Regular season ====
Date	Opponent	Stadium	Result	Attendance	Record
April 21	at Charlotte Hounds	American Legion Memorial Stadium	L 7-25	1,346	0-1
April 28	at Atlanta Blaze	Fifth Third Bank Stadium	L 12-19	1,967	0-2
May 5	Dallas Rattlers	Harvard Stadium	L 12-13	4,102	0-3
May 10	at Florida Launch	FAU Stadium	W 15-9	1,576	1-3
May 12	Atlanta Blaze	Harvard Stadium	L 14-17	4,210	1-4
May 19	Chesapeake Bayhawks	Hingham High School (Hingham, MA)	L 11-14	3,500	1-5
June 2	Florida Launch	Endicott College (Beverly, MA)	W 16-15	2,648	2-5
June 7	at Dallas Rattlers	The Ford Center at The Star	L 11-22	3,816	2-6
June 23	New York Lizards	Endicott College (Beverly, MA)	W 15-13	3,468	3-6
July 2	at Chesapeake Bayhawks	Navy-Marine Corps Memorial Stadium	L 8-15	5,244	3-7
July 4	at Denver Outlaws	Sports Authority Field at Mile High	L 11-25	29,973	3-8
July 19	at New York Lizards	James M. Shuart Stadium	L 13-14	5,017	3-9
July 28	Charlotte Hounds	Harvard Stadium	W 14-7	4,384	4-9
August 4	Ohio Machine	Harvard Stadium	w 23-14	3,864	5-9

== Standings ==
2018 Major League Lacrosse Standings
	W	L	PCT	GB	GF	2ptGF	GA	2ptGA
Dallas Rattlers	11	3	.786	-	201	8	175	2
Chesapeake Bayhawks	9	5	.643	2	176	11	174	7
Denver Outlaws	8	6	.571	3	225	5	183	14
New York Lizards	8	6	.571	3	211	5	214	5
Charlotte Hounds	7	7	.500	4	196	8	191	4
Atlanta Blaze	7	7	.500	4	187	10	184	7
Boston Cannons	5	9	.357	6	173	9	213	9
Florida Launch	5	9	.357	6	192	4	201	10
Ohio Machine	3	11	.214	8	173	6	199	8

Playoff Seed
