= 2018 Florida Launch season =

2018 Florida Launch
- League: Major League Lacrosse
- 2018 record: 5-9
- General Manager: Tom Mariano
- Coach: Tom Mariano
- Captain: Steven Brooks, Tucker Durkin
- Arena: FAU Stadium

The 2018 Florida Launch season is the fifth season for the Florida Launch of Major League Lacrosse. The Launch are coming off their best year in franchise history, going 8-6 in 2017 and clinching the team's first ever playoff berth where they fell to the eventual champion Ohio Machine. They look to continue that success in 2018.

== Offseason ==
- September 5, 2017 - Chazz Woodson retires from Major League Lacrosse after 12 seasons of seven different teams, including the first Florida Launch playoff squad in 2017.
- October 10 - Reigning Defensive Player of the Year Tucker Durkin signs a contract extension with the Launch through the 2018 season.

== Schedule ==
=== Regular season ===
Date	Opponent	Stadium	Result	Attendance	Record
April 22	at Atlanta Blaze	Fifth Third Bank Stadium	W 13-10	1,043	1-0
April 28	Chesapeake Bayhawks	FAU Stadium	L 11-14	2,897	1-1
May 6	Denver Outlaws	FAU Stadium	W 16-7	2,406	2-1
May 10	Boston Cannons	FAU Stadium	L 9-15	1,576	2-2
May 19	New York Lizards	FAU Stadium	L 13-14	2,082	2-3
May 26	Dallas Rattlers	FAU Stadium	L 13-19	1,011	2-4
June 2	at Boston Cannons	Endicott College (Beverly, MA)	L 15-16	2,648	2-5
June 9	at New York Lizards	James M. Shuart Stadium	W 20-18	5,237	3-5
June 16	at Denver Outlaws	Sports Authority Field at Mile High	L 15-26	4,734	3-6
June 23	at Charlotte Hounds	American Legion Memorial Stadium	W 21-17	1,975	4-6
July 7	Ohio Machine	FAU Stadium	L 11-13	2,127	4-7
July 26	at Ohio Machine	Fortress Obetz	W 13-12	2,387	5-7
July 28	Atlanta Blaze	FAU Stadium	L 13-16		5-8
August 4	at Dallas Rattlers	The Ford Center at The Star	L 13-14	5,297	5-9

== Standings ==
2018 Major League Lacrosse Standings
	W	L	PCT	GB	GF	2ptGF	GA	2ptGA
Dallas Rattlers	11	3	.786	-	201	8	175	2
Chesapeake Bayhawks	9	5	.643	2	176	11	174	7
Denver Outlaws	8	6	.571	3	225	5	183	14
New York Lizards	8	6	.571	3	211	5	214	5
Charlotte Hounds	7	7	.500	4	196	8	191	4
Atlanta Blaze	7	7	.500	4	187	10	184	7
Boston Cannons	5	9	.357	6	173	9	213	9
Florida Launch	5	9	.357	6	192	4	201	10
Ohio Machine	3	11	.214	8	173	6	199	8

Playoff Seed
