= 2018 Atlanta Blaze season =

2018 Atlanta Blaze
- League: Major League Lacrosse
- 2018 record: 7-7
- Home record: 2-5
- Road record: 5-2
- Goals for: 187 (10 2-point goals)
- Goals against: 184 (7 2-point goal)
- General Manager: Spencer Ford
- Coach: Liam Banks
- Stadium: Fifth Third Bank Stadium

The 2018 Atlanta Blaze season was the third season for the Atlanta Blaze of Major League Lacrosse. The Blaze created a lot of noise in the preceding offseason period. On September 12, 2017, the Blaze signed former Lizard Tommy Palasek. Later in the month, the Blaze also signed Matt Gibson from the Lizards and acquired Eddy Glazener from the Denver Outlaws for Christian Burgdorf.

On December 18, 2017, Blaze head coach Dave Huntley died unexpectedly at the age of 60. Former MLL player Liam Banks was named his replacement on January 15, 2018, becoming the third head coach in the young team's history.

For the second straight year, the Blaze improved their record, finishing .500 for the first time in franchise history at 7-7. The team entered the final week of the season just needing a win to clinch a playoff spot. However, the Blaze lost a close one to the Denver Outlaws, 15-14.

== Milestones and events ==
=== Offseason ===
- December 18, 2017 - Head coach Dave Huntley died unexpectedly at the age of 60.
- January 9, 2018 - Jim Pfeifer was renamed President of the Blaze. He served the same role for the team from December 2016 to May 2017.
- January 15 - Former MLL player Liam Banks was named the third head coach in Blaze history.
- April 18 - Commissioner Sandy Brown announces the sale of the Blaze to Andre Gudger, founder and CEO of technology investment company Eccalon.

=== Regular season ===
- May 31 - The Blaze make a flurry of trades and acquire faceoff specialist Joe Nardella from the Boston Cannons, and send Jake Withers to the Charlotte Hounds in exchange for a 2019 second round draft pick.
- July 25 - Major League Lacrosse announces the site of the All Star Games for 2019, 2020, and 2021. After hosting the championship games from 2014 to 2016, Atlanta will host its first All Star Game in 2020.

== Schedule ==
=== Regular season ===
Date	Opponent	Stadium	Result	Attendance	Record
April 22	Florida Launch	Fifth Third Bank Stadium	L 10-13	1,043	0-1
April 28	Boston Cannons	Fifth Third Bank Stadium	W 19-12	1,967	1-1
May 6	at New York Lizards	James M. Shuart Stadium	W 16-14	3,219	2-1
May 12	at Boston Cannons	Harvard Stadium	W 17-14	4,210	3-1
May 19	at Dallas Rattlers	The Ford Center at The Star	L 14-15 (OT)	4,732	3-2
June 2	New York Lizards	Fifth Third Bank Stadium	L 17-20	2,326	3-3
June 9	Charlotte Hounds	Fifth Third Bank Stadium	L 13-19	1,481	3-4
June 16	at Chesapeake Bayhawks	Navy-Marine Corps Memorial Stadium	L 6-9	4,734	3-5
June 23	Dallas Rattlers	Fifth Third Bank Stadium	L 14-16	1,233	3-6
June 30	at Charlotte Hounds	MUSC Health Stadium (Charleston, SC)	W 16-10	1,145	4-6
July 21	at Ohio Machine	Fortress Obetz	W 13-10	3,288	5-6
July 26	Chesapeake Bayhawks	Fifth Third Bank Stadium	W 12-11	1,406	6-6
July 28	at Florida Launch	FAU Stadium	W 16-13		7-6
August 4	Denver Outlaws	Fifth Third Bank Stadium	L 14-15	2,204	7-7

== Standings ==
2018 Major League Lacrosse Standings
	W	L	PCT	GB	GF	2ptGF	GA	2ptGA
Dallas Rattlers	11	3	.786	-	201	8	175	2
Chesapeake Bayhawks	9	5	.643	2	176	11	174	7
Denver Outlaws	8	6	.571	3	225	5	183	14
New York Lizards	8	6	.571	3	211	5	214	5
Charlotte Hounds	7	7	.500	4	196	8	191	4
Atlanta Blaze	7	7	.500	4	187	10	184	7
Boston Cannons	5	9	.357	6	173	9	213	9
Florida Launch	5	9	.357	6	192	4	201	10
Ohio Machine	3	11	.214	8	173	6	199	8

Playoff Seed
