= 2018 Ohio Machine season =

2018 Ohio Machine
- League: Major League Lacrosse
- 2018 record: 3-11
- General Manager: Bear Davis
- Coach: Bear Davis
- Arena: Fortress Obetz

The 2018 Ohio Machine season is the seventh season for the Ohio Machine of Major League Lacrosse. The reigning champion Machine come into the year looking to repeat as Steinfeld Cup Champions. They would be the first team since the Chesapeake Bayhawks in 2012 and 2013 to do so.

The Machine opened their title defense on April 29 with a historic output from Marcus Holman, who scored a league record 11 goals in a 25-13 victory over the New York Lizards. The team took a hard fall, though, losing ten of their last 11 games and finishing with a league-worst 3-11 record.

== Offseason ==
- October 2, 2017 - The Machine agreed to trade attackman Steele Stanwick to the Chesapeake Bayhawks in return for a second round pick in the 2019 collegiate draft. The team also agreed to send faceoff specialist Kevin Reisman to the Florida Launch in exchange for a fourth round pick in the 2018 supplemental draft.
- October 8 - The Machine hosted the first Ohio Lacrosse Fall Classic at Fortress Obetz against the Ohio State Buckeyes men's lacrosse team.
- November 7 - Machine president Ryan Chenault confirms the team will extend head coach Bear Davis's contract through the 2020 season, after Davis led the franchise to its first MLL title in 2017.

== Regular season ==
=== Transactions ===
- May 30 - The Machine agree to trade midfielder Mark Cockerton and a 2019 collegiate draft seventh round pick to the Boston Cannons in exchange for attackman Davey Emala.
- June 19 - The Machine send defenseman Matt McMahon to the Charlotte Hounds in exchange for defender Ben Randall.
- June 26 - The Machine send defenseman Jake Bernhardt to the New York Lizards in exchange for Ryan Walsh and a 2019 second round draft pick.
- June 27 - Connor Cannizzaro announces his retirement after being the team drafted him fifth in the 2017 collegiate draft.

=== Schedule ===
==== Regular season ====
Date	Opponent	Stadium	Result	Attendance	Record
April 29	New York Lizards	Fortress Obetz	W 25-13	3,347	1-0
May 5	Charlotte Hounds	Fortress Obetz	L 10-14	2,478	1-1
May 12	Dallas Rattlers	Fortress Obetz	W 14-12	2,068	2-1
May 26	at Charlotte Hounds	American Legion Memorial Stadium	L 12-14	1,267	2-2
June 2	at Chesapeake Bayhawks	Navy-Marine Corps Memorial Stadium	L 8-13	3,154	2-3
June 7	at Denver Outlaws	Sports Authority Field at Mile High	L 6-17	6,388	2-4
June 9	Chesapeake Bayhawks	Fortress Obetz	L 12-15	2,865	2-5
June 16	at Dallas Rattlers	The Ford Center at The Star	L 16-17	3,011	2-6
June 23	Denver Outlaws	Fortress Obetz	L 13-17	2,226	2-7
June 30	at New York Lizards	James M. Shuart Stadium	L 14-15	5,057	2-8
July 7	at Florida Launch	FAU Stadium	W 13-11	2,127	3-8
July 21	Atlanta Blaze	Fortress Obetz	L 10-13	3,288	3-9
July 26	Florida Launch	Fortress Obetz	L 12-13	2,387	3-10
August 4	at Boston Cannons	Harvard Stadium	L 14-23	3,864	3-11

== Standings ==
2018 Major League Lacrosse Standings
	W	L	PCT	GB	GF	2ptGF	GA	2ptGA
Dallas Rattlers	11	3	.786	-	201	8	175	2
Chesapeake Bayhawks	9	5	.643	2	176	11	174	7
Denver Outlaws	8	6	.571	3	225	5	183	14
New York Lizards	8	6	.571	3	211	5	214	5
Charlotte Hounds	7	7	.500	4	196	8	191	4
Atlanta Blaze	7	7	.500	4	187	10	184	7
Boston Cannons	5	9	.357	6	173	9	213	9
Florida Launch	5	9	.357	6	192	4	201	10
Ohio Machine	3	11	.214	8	173	6	199	8

Playoff Seed
