= 2018 Chesapeake Bayhawks season =

Lacrosse season

2018 Chesapeake Bayhawks
- League: Major League Lacrosse
- 2018 record: 9-5
- General Manager: Dave Cottle
- Coach: Dave Cottle
- Arena: Navy-Marine Corps Memorial Stadium

The 2018 Chesapeake Bayhawks season was the eighteenth season for the Chesapeake Bayhawks of Major League Lacrosse, and ninth using the Chesapeake moniker (the team was previously the Baltimore Bayhawks and the Washington Bayhawks). The Bayhawks came into the year looking to improve upon their 7–7 finish in 2017 in which they finished sixth place in the league and missed out on the playoffs for the fourth consecutive year. General manager Dave Cottle returned to the sidelines as head coach for the first time since 2015 after the Bayhawks and Brian Reese parted ways in September. In Cottle's first year back on the sidelines, the Bayhawks finished 9–5 and second place in the league. In their return to the postseason, the Bayhawks lost to the Denver Outlaws in the semifinal round, 13–12.

== Offseason ==
- September 14, 2017 - Head coach Brian Reese and the Bayhawks part ways. In two seasons, Reese led Chesapeake to a 15–13 record but no playoff appearances.
- November 30 - Bayhawks ownership made their plans of a new 10,000-seat stadium official. The three-phase project would be located in Crownsville, Maryland at the site of a defunct hospital and include 20 multiuse fields, an entertainment and restaurant district, and 6,000-seat amphitheater.
- December 13 - General manager Dave Cottle is announced the Bayhawks' head coach for 2018. Cottle coached the Bayhawks to a 30–26 record and two championships from 2012 to 2015.
- February 20, 2018 - The team announces its June 2 game against the Ohio Machine will be the nightcap of a doubleheader featuring the Baltimore Brave and the Philadelphia Fire of the newly founded Women's Professional Lacrosse League.

=== Transactions ===
- October 3, 2017 - The Bayhawks received attackman Steele Stanwick from the Ohio Machine in exchange for a second-round draft pick in the 2019 collegiate draft.

== Regular season ==
- May 3 - The Bayhawks secure a unique partnership with NBC Sports Washington in which the station will broadcast all Bayhawks games, both home and away, on a tape delay basis.

=== Schedule ===
Date	Opponent	Stadium	Result	Attendance	Record
April 21	Dallas Rattlers	Navy-Marine Corps Memorial Stadium	L 9–15	2,915	0–1
April 28	at Florida Launch	FAU Stadium	W 14–11	2,897	1–1
May 3	at Charlotte Hounds	American Legion Memorial Stadium	L 13–14	1,059	1–2
May 13	at Denver Outlaws	Sports Authority Field at Mile High	W 24–22	1,788	2–2
May 19	at Boston Cannons	Hingham High School (Hingham, MA)	W 14–11	3,500	3–2
June 2	Ohio Machine	Navy-Marine Corps Memorial Stadium	W 13–8	3,154	4–2
June 9	at Ohio Machine	Fortress Obetz	W 15–12	2,865	5–2
June 16	Atlanta Blaze	Navy-Marine Corps Memorial Stadium	W 9–6	4,734	6–2
July 2	Boston Cannons	Navy-Marine Corps Memorial Stadium	W 15–8	5,244	7–2
July 7	New York Lizards	Navy-Marine Corps Memorial Stadium	W 16–13	5,443	8–2
July 21	Charlotte Hounds	Navy-Marine Corps Memorial Stadium	L 10–20	2,544	8–3
July 26	at Atlanta Blaze	Fifth Third Bank Stadium	L 11–12	1,406	8–4
July 28	Denver Outlaws	Navy-Marine Corps Memorial Stadium	W 13–11	5,149	9–4
August 4	at New York Lizards	James M. Shuart Stadium	L 11–18	5,315	9–5

== Postseason ==
Date	Round	Opponent	Stadium	Result	Attendance
August 11	Semifinal	Denver Outlaws	Navy-Marine Corps Memorial Stadium	L 12–13	2,977

== Standings ==
2018 Major League Lacrosse Standings
	W	L	PCT	GB	GF	2ptGF	GA	2ptGA
Dallas Rattlers	11	3	.786	-	201	8	175	2
Chesapeake Bayhawks	9	5	.643	2	176	11	174	7
Denver Outlaws	8	6	.571	3	225	5	183	14
New York Lizards	8	6	.571	3	211	5	214	5
Charlotte Hounds	7	7	.500	4	196	8	191	4
Atlanta Blaze	7	7	.500	4	187	10	184	7
Boston Cannons	5	9	.357	6	173	9	213	9
Florida Launch	5	9	.357	6	192	4	201	10
Ohio Machine	3	11	.214	8	173	6	199	8

Playoff Seed
