= 2018 Dallas Rattlers season =

2018 Dallas Rattlers
- League: Major League Lacrosse
- 2018 record: 11-3
- General Manager: Bill Warder
- Coach: Bill Warder
- Arena: The Ford Center at The Star

The 2018 Dallas Rattlers season is the sixteenth season for the Rattlers franchise of Major League Lacrosse, and first season the team will play in Frisco, Texas after relocating from Rochester, New York. The league made the move official on November 16, 2017 and also announced that Tim Soudan would not be returning as head coach. Instead, longtime assistant coach Bill Warder would be named the team's fourth head coach.

The Rattlers made themselves right at home in their new market. The team finished first place in the league at 11–3, and also had a 6–1 record at Ford Center at The Star. Five of their seven home games were decided by only one goal. The Rattlers hosted their formal in-state rival in the New York Lizards on August 11 in the league semifinal game, where the Rattlers defeated the Lizards 15–12. The next week in Charleston, South Carolina, the team was defeated by the Denver Outlaws in the 2018 Steinfeld Cup.

== Offseason ==
=== Transactions ===
- December 1, 2017 - The Rattlers resigned two big names from player movement in goalie John Galloway and defenseman Joel White.
- December 5 - Attackman Jeremy Boltus and defenseman John Lade sign contracts to remain with the Rattlers in 2018.
- December 7 - Midfielders Jordan MacIntosh and John Ranagan resigned with the team. To make room on the 23-man roster, the Rattlers waived goalie Kris Alleyne and attackman Frank Brown.
- December 11 - The Rattlers announced the resigning of attackman Ned Crotty and defenseman Mike Manley and signing of attackman Chris Bocklet through player movement. In result, Jeremy Boltus, Jack Bruckner, and John Moderski were all waived to make room on the roster.
- January 17, 2018 - Prior to the 2018 Supplemental Draft, the Rattlers made a trade with the Atlanta Blaze. The Rattlers acquired attackman Randy Staats, midfielder Jesse King, and a seventh round 2018 collegiate draft pick in exchange for a future third, fourth, and sixth round pick. In the supplemental draft, four of the Rattlers picks were Texas residents: Zack Greer, Christian Carson-Banister, Zack Price and Luke Cometti.

== Regular season ==
- June 22 - Midfielder Donny Moss is suspended for one game for a hit on Peter Baum in the last few seconds of a home win against the Ohio Machine.

=== Schedule ===
Date	Opponent	Stadium	Result	Attendance	Record
April 21	at Chesapeake Bayhawks	Navy-Marine Corps Memorial Stadium	W 15-9	2,915	1-0
April 27	at Charlotte Hounds	American Legion Memorial Stadium	L 12-13	1,287	1-1
April 29	Denver Outlaws	The Ford Center at The Star	W 15-14 (OT)	7,217	2-1
May 5	at Boston Cannons	Harvard Stadium	W 13-12	4,102	3-1
May 12	at Ohio Machine	Fortress Obetz	L 12-14	2,068	3-2
May 19	Atlanta Blaze	The Ford Center at The Star	W 15-14 (OT)	4,732	4-2
May 26	at Florida Launch	FAU Stadium	W 19-13	1,011	5-2
June 7	Boston Cannons	The Ford Center at The Star	W 22-11	3,816	6-2
June 16	Ohio Machine	The Ford Center at The Star	W 17-16	3,011	7-2
June 23	at Atlanta Blaze	Fifth Third Bank Stadium	W 16-14	1,233	8-2
July 7	Charlotte Hounds	The Ford Center at The Star	W 14-9	4,671	9-2
July 22	at Denver Outlaws	Sports Authority Field at Mile High	W 13-12	5,316	10-2
July 29	New York Lizards	The Ford Center at The Star	L 12-13	4,712	10-3
August 4	Florida Launch	The Ford Center at The Star	W 14-13	5,297	11-3

== Postseason ==
Date	Round	Opponent	Stadium	Result	Attendance
August 11	Semifinal	New York Lizards	The Ford Center at The Star	W 15-12	6,124
August 18	Steinfeld Cup	Denver Outlaws	MUSC Health Stadium (Charleston, SC)	L 16-12	4,086

== Standings ==
2018 Major League Lacrosse Standings
	W	L	PCT	GB	GF	2ptGF	GA	2ptGA
Dallas Rattlers	11	3	.786	-	201	8	175	2
Chesapeake Bayhawks	9	5	.643	2	176	11	174	7
Denver Outlaws	8	6	.571	3	225	5	183	14
New York Lizards	8	6	.571	3	211	5	214	5
Charlotte Hounds	7	7	.500	4	196	8	191	4
Atlanta Blaze	7	7	.500	4	187	10	184	7
Boston Cannons	5	9	.357	6	173	9	213	9
Florida Launch	5	9	.357	6	192	4	201	10
Ohio Machine	3	11	.214	8	173	6	199	8

Playoff Seed
