= 2018 Charlotte Hounds season =

2018 Charlotte Hounds
- League: Major League Lacrosse
- 2018 record: 7-7
- General Manager: Mike Cerino
- Coach: Jim Stagnitta
- Arena: American Legion Memorial Stadium

The 2018 Charlotte Hounds season was the seventh season for the Charlotte Hounds of Major League Lacrosse. The Hounds started the season 4-0 for the first time in franchise history, highlighted by a 25-7 Week 1 mauling over the Boston Cannons and two victories over the defending champion Ohio Machine. However, the Hounds struggled to the finish line, finishing at 7-7 and being eliminated from the playoffs in the penultimate week of the regular season.

For the second season in a row, the Hounds finished last in attendance at 1,364 fans a game. In 2017, the Hounds posted the league's worst attendance for the first time in franchise history at just under 1,600 a game. This is a drop from their peak in their inaugural 2012 season in which they averaged over 5,700 fans a game.

== Offseason ==
- October 12, 2017 - The Hounds agreed to trade Brendan Fowler to the New York Lizards in exchange for midfielder Jake Richard and a second round pick in the 2018 collegiate draft.
- December 19 - A $32 million renovation project of American Legion Memorial Stadium was approved by the county.

== Regular season ==
- May 31 - The Hounds agree to give up a 2019 collegiate draft second round pick to the Atlanta Blaze in exchange for faceoff specialist Jake Withers.
- June 19 - Hounds defenseman Ben Randall is traded from Charlotte to the Ohio Machine in exchange for defender Matt McMahon.

== Schedule ==
=== Regular season ===
Date	Opponent	Stadium	Result	Attendance	Record
April 21	Boston Cannons	American Legion Memorial Stadium	W 25-7	1,346	1-0
April 27	Dallas Rattlers	American Legion Memorial Stadium	W 13-12	1,287	2-0
May 3	Chesapeake Bayhawks	American Legion Memorial Stadium	W 14-13	1,059	3-0
May 5	at Ohio Machine	Fortress Obetz	W 14-10	2,478	4-0
May 19	at Denver Outlaws	Sports Authority Field at Mile High	L 13-17	2,665	4-1
May 26	Ohio Machine	American Legion Memorial Stadium	W 14-12	1,267	5-1
June 2	Denver Outlaws	American Legion Memorial Stadium	L 13-16	1,469	5-2
June 9	at Atlanta Blaze	Fifth Third Bank Stadium	W 19-13	1,481	6-2
June 16	at New York Lizards	James M. Shuart Stadium	L 16-20	5,319	6-3
June 23	Florida Launch	American Legion Memorial Stadium	L 17-21	1,975	6-4
June 30	Atlanta Blaze	MUSC Health Stadium (Charleston, SC)	L 10-16	1,145	6-5
July 7	at Dallas Rattlers	The Ford Center at The Star	L 9-14	4,671	6-6
July 21	at Chesapeake Bayhawks	Navy-Marine Corps Memorial Stadium	W 20-10	2,544	7-6
July 28	at Boston Cannons	Harvard Stadium	L 7-14	4,384	7-7

== Standings ==
2018 Major League Lacrosse Standings
	W	L	PCT	GB	GF	2ptGF	GA	2ptGA
Dallas Rattlers	11	3	.786	-	201	8	175	2
Chesapeake Bayhawks	9	5	.643	2	176	11	174	7
Denver Outlaws	8	6	.571	3	225	5	183	14
New York Lizards	8	6	.571	3	211	5	214	5
Charlotte Hounds	7	7	.500	4	196	8	191	4
Atlanta Blaze	7	7	.500	4	187	10	184	7
Boston Cannons	5	9	.357	6	173	9	213	9
Florida Launch	5	9	.357	6	192	4	201	10
Ohio Machine	3	11	.214	8	173	6	199	8

Playoff Seed
