= Tucker Durkin =

American lacrosse player (born 1990)

Personal information
- Nationality: American
- Born: September 5, 1990 (age 35) Huntingdon Valley, Pennsylvania, U.S.
- Height: 6 ft 2 in (188 cm)
- Weight: 210 lb (95 kg; 15 st 0 lb)

Sport
- Position: Defense
- Shoots: Right
- NCAA team: Johns Hopkins (2013)
- MLL draft: 3rd overall, 2013; Charlotte Hounds
- MLL teams: Hamilton Nationals; Florida Launch
- PLL team: Atlas Lacrosse Club
- Pro career: 2013–

Career highlights
- PLL: 3x All-Star (2019, 2021, 2022); 1x All-Pro (2019); MLL: 3x All-Star (2014, 2016, 2018); 1x Defensive Player of the Year (2017); NCAA: JHU Athletics Hall of Fame Induction (2024); 2x Schmeisser Award (2012, 2013); 2x First Team All-American (2012, 2013); 1x Second Team All-American (2011); International: 2014 World Lacrosse Championship Best Defenseman; All-World Team (2014)

Tucker Durkin (born September 5, 1990 in Huntingdon Valley, Pennsylvania) is an American retired professional lacrosse player.

Durkin played lacrosse collegiately at Johns Hopkins University. There he won the division 1 defenseman of the year award twice consecutively in 2012 and 2013. He was inducted into the Johns Hopkins Athletic Hall of Fame in 2024. He was drafted third overall to the Hamilton Nationals, who later became the Florida Launch in Major League Lacrosse. He then joined the Atlas Lacrosse Club of the Premier Lacrosse League, founded in 2019, retiring after the 2023 season.

He played for the United States men's national lacrosse team twice, at the 2014 tournament and the 2018 tournament, winning the tournament best defenseman award and the 2018 championship. Tucker Durkin is one of the most decorated and dominant defensemen of his era, known for his toughness, leadership and tremendous stick checks.

He is currently the defensive coordinator for the Drexel Men’s Lacrosse program.

== College career ==
Durkin attended Johns Hopkins University, after originally committing to Bucknell. At Hopkins, he started all 59 games he played in, collecting 127 groundballs and causing 65 turnovers. His junior and senior years he was awarded the Schmeisser Award winner for being the nation's top defensemen, named a First Team All-American, and totaled a team-high 19 forced turnovers and 35 ground balls.

In 2013, Durkin won the William C. Schmeisser Award as the nation's top defenseman for the second year in a row, making him the 8th player in college lacrosse history to win the award twice. He was also a first team All-American for the second straight year. He totaled 16 caused turnovers and finished with 32 ground balls.

In 2012, Durkin won the William C. Schmeisser Award as the nation's top defenseman, making him the 13th different Johns Hopkins player to win the Schmeisser Award (the 13 have won it 16 times). He was also a first team All-American. He totaled a team-high 19 caused turnovers and finished third on the team with 35 ground balls. He notched the second point of his career - an assist - in a 17-6 win over Albany. Durkin was a leader of a JHU defense that held 13 of 16 opponents to nine goals or less and finished seventh in the nation in scoring defense (7.38).

In 2011, Durkin was a Second Team USILA All-American making him first sophomore defenseman at Johns Hopkins to earn First or Second Team All-America honors since Dave Pietramala grabbed first team honors in 1987 Durkin started all 16 games on close defense and had one assist, 35 ground balls and 11 caused turnovers on the year. He was a leader of a defense that finished sixth in the nation in scoring defense (7.25). Notched first career point - an assist - in the win vs. Manhattan.

In 2010 Durkin started all 15 games on close defense, making him the only freshman to start every game and the first JHU freshman to start a season-opener on close defense since Matt Drenan in 2006. He was part of a JHU defense that held Manhattan scoreless for the first 53:12 - the longest such streak in the Dave Pietramala era. Against Maryland, Durkin had three ground balls and three caused turnovers and forced a turnover in final 20 seconds that gave JHU a chance to tie the game in the. Against Loyola, Durkin totaled three ground balls and two caused turnovers and attempted the first four faceoffs of his career, going 1-of-4.

Tucker Durkin was inducted into the Johns Hopkins Athletics Hall of Fame in 2024.

== Professional career ==
In 2013, the Hamilton Nationals selected Durkin with the third overall pick in the 2013 Major League Lacrosse Collegiate Draft. Durkin was named a 2013 ALL-MLL Defenseman, the only rookie in MLL history to be named All Pro.

In 2014, Durkin played for the Florida Launch in their first year. He was named to 2014 All-MLL Pro Team for the second year. He played in 10 MLL games, as well as the 2014 FIL World Championship, where he was named Outstanding Defender of the Championships and All-World Team.

In 2015, with the Florida Launch, Durkin played in all 14 games. He had the first Florida Launch assist of the 2015 season at Chesapeake on April 26. Durkin scored his first goal of season at Rochester on May 3, along with two groundballs. He had four groundballs at Charlotte on July 11. He scored another goal against the Denver Outlaws on July 19, while also establishing a new season high with five groundballs in the game. Durkin was named Coca-Cola Player of the game versus Rochester on July 25, after holding the Rattlers’ leading scorer to one goal, and was also named Week 15 Warrior Defensive Player of the Week. Durkin was named to this his third All-MLL Pro Team.

In 2016, with the Florida Launch, Tucker earned his fourth All-MLL team selection and third MLL All-Star Game appearance. He played in 13 games for the Launch in 2016. In the home opener against the Ohio Machine on April 23, he logged a season high of five groundballs. He had four groundballs against the Atlanta Blaze on May 21.

In 2017, Durkin made Team USA and won MLL Defensive Player of the Year for the Launch. Durkin was also named to his 5th straight All-MLL Pro Team.

Before the 2018 season, Durkin re-signed with the Florida Launch for one season. Durkin played in 11 games, scooping up 16 total ground balls and causing five turnovers. Tucker Durkin was one of three defenders nominated by the league for Warrior Defensive Player of the Year at the 2018 MLL Honors. Durkin was named to his 6th All-MLL Pro Team.

In 2019, Durkin played for Atlas Lacrosse Club in Paul Rabil’s Premier Lacrosse League.

== Coaching career ==
Durkin was the head coach of Bryn Athyn College from 2016-2019, where he had a career record of 30-29, and lead them to the North Eastern Athletic Conference championship in 2018. On July 15, 2019, Durkin was named as the defensive coordinator for the Drexel Dragons men's lacrosse team.

== Awards and achievements ==
Premier Lacrosse League:

- 1st Team PLL All Pro (2019)
- PLL All Star (2019)

Major League Lacrosse: (2013 - 2018)

- 1st Team MLL All Pro (2018)
- MLL Defensive Player of The Year (2017)
- 1st Team MLL All Pro (2017)
- 1st Team MLL All Pro (2016)
- 1st Team MLL All Pro (2015)
- 1st Team MLL All Pro (2014)
- 1st Team MLL All Pro (2013)

NCAA: Johns Hopkins Lacrosse

- All-Time Johns Hopkins Team
- 2013 USILA First Team All-American
- 2013 William C. Schmeisser Award Winner
- 2013 Tewaaraton Trophy Semi Finalist
- 2013 Co-Captain
- 2012 USILA First Team All-American
- 2012 William C. Schmeisser Award Winner
- 2011 USILA Second Team All-American
- Started all 54 games of his career at Johns Hopkins University

FIL: Team USA

- 2018 World Lacrosse Championship Gold Medal
- 2018 Member of Team USA
- 2014 Member of Team USA
- 2014 World Lacrosse Championship Most Outstanding Defender
- 2014 World Lacrosse Championship All-World Defender

== Statistics ==
=== Major League Lacrosse ===
		Regular Season													Playoffs
Season	Team	GP	G	2ptG	A	Pts	GB	PIM	PPG	PPA	GWG	S	SPCT	SOG	GP	G	2ptG	A	Pts	GB	PIM	PPG	PPA	GWG	S	SPCT	SOG
2013	Hamilton	11	--	--	--	--	24	6.5	--	--	--	--	--	--	1	--	--	--	--	3	--	--	--	--	--	--	--
2014	Florida	10	--	--	--	--	15	4.5	--	--	--	--	--	--	--	--	--	--	--	--	--	--	--	--	--	--	--
2015	Florida	14	2	--	1	3	28	8.5	--	--	--	--	--	--	--	--	--	--	--	--	--	--	--	--	--	--	--
2016	Florida	14	--	--	1	1	28	5	--	--	--	--	--	--	--	--	--	--	--	--	--	--	--	--	--	--	--
2017	Florida	13	--	--	--	--	11	4	--	--	--	--	--	--	1	--	--	--	--	2	--	--	--	--	--	--	--
2018	Florida	11	--	--	--	--	16	1.5	--	--	--	--	--	--	--	--	--	--	--	--	--	--	--	--	--	--	--
MLL Totals		73	2	--	2	4	122	30	--	--	--	--	--	--	2	--	--	--	--	5	--	--	--	--	--	--	--

=== Premier Lacrosse League ===
Season	Team	Regular season											Playoffs										
Season	Team	GP	G	2PG	A	Pts	Sh	GB	Pen	PIM	FOW	FOA	GP	G	2PG	A	Pts	Sh	GB	Pen	PIM	FOW	FOA
2019	Atlas	10	0	0	0	0	0	18	0	4	0	0	2	0	0	0	0	0	6	0	0	0	0
2020	Atlas	3	0	0	0	0	1	1	0	0	0	0	–	–	–	–	–	–	–	–	–	–	–
2021	Atlas	9	0	0	0	0	1	14	2	2	0	0	2	0	0	0	0	0	3	0	0	0	0
2022	Atlas	10	0	0	0	0	0	10	2	1.5	0	0	1	0	0	0	0	0	1	0	0	0	0
2023	Atlas	10	0	0	0	0	0	10	2	1.5	0	0	1	0	0	0	0	0	1	0	0	0	0
		42	0	0	0	0	2	53	6	9	0	0	6	0	0	0	0	0	11	0	0	0	0
Career total:		48	0	0	0	0	2	64	6	9	0	0											

GP–Games played; G–Goals; 2PG–2-point goals; A–Assists; Pts–Points; Sh–Shots; GB–Ground balls; Pen–Penalties; PIM–Penalty minutes; FOW–Faceoffs won; FOA–Faceoffs attempted

== See also ==
- Johns Hopkins Blue Jays men's lacrosse
- Lacrosse in Pennsylvania
