= 2018 Major League Lacrosse season =

2018 MLL season
- League: Major League Lacrosse
- Sport: Field lacrosse
- Duration: April 21 – August 18, 2018
- Teams: 9

Draft
- Top draft pick: Trevor Baptiste
- Picked by: Boston Cannons

Regular season
- Top seed: Dallas Rattlers
- Season MVP: Rob Pannell (New York Lizards)
- Top scorer: Rob Pannell (New York Lizards

Playoffs
- Finals champions: Denver Outlaws (3rd title)
- Runners-up: Dallas Rattlers
- Finals MVP: Matt Kavanagh (Outlaws)

MLL seasons
- ← 2017 season 2019 season →

The 2018 Major League Lacrosse season is the 18th season of Major League Lacrosse. The season began on Saturday, April 21 with three games. For the third straight year, the league consists of nine teams playing 14 games each. However, the league announced on November 16, 2017 that the Rochester Rattlers, one of the league's four remaining charter franchises, would relocate to Frisco, Texas and become the Dallas Rattlers. The reigning champions for the first time are the Ohio Machine, who would take a hard fall and finish 3-11 in 2018. The season culminated on Saturday, August 18 with the Denver Outlaws hoisting their third Steinfeld Trophy in Charleston, South Carolina at MUSC Health Stadium after defeating the Rattlers, 16-12.

== Milestones and events ==
- November 28, 2017 - The league announces the 2018 schedule. The season will begin on Saturday, April 21 with three games.
- December 18 - Atlanta Blaze head coach Dave Huntley died at the age of 60.
- February 6, 2018 - Alexander P. "Sandy" Brown is named second commissioner in the history of Major League Lacrosse. Most recently Brown spent time as President/CEO of One World Sports.
- April 18 - Commissioner Sandy Brown announces the league has approved the sale of the Atlanta Blaze to Andre Gudger, founder and CEO of technology investment company Eccalon.
- April 26 - The league announces the 2018 Championship Game will be held in Charleston, South Carolina on August 18 at MUSC Health Stadium, home to the Charleston Battery. It is the first MLL game to be held in South Carolina.
- April 29 - In the Machine's first game defending their championship, Marcus Holman scores a league-record 11 goals in a 25-13 victory over the Lizards.
- June 9 - Paul Rabil becomes the league's all-time leading scorer with his 542nd point.
- June 16 - Paul Rabil becomes the second player in league history to score 300 goals in a 20-16 New York win over Charlotte.
- June 27 - Lax Sports Network and ESPN+ agree to a multi-year partnership, highlighted by an MLL Game of the Week and a new original weekly show Lacrosse America (premiering July 6). LSN, who has owned the league's broadcast rights, also announces it will become a free service effective immediately.
- July 22 - Goalie Kaisuke Iwamoto becomes the first player born in Japan to start in a Major League Lacrosse game. Iwamoto, who suited up for the Outlaws in a game against the Rattlers, had nine saves on 19 shots in over three quarters of action.
- July 25 - The league announces the site of its next three All Star Games. The Bayhawks will host at Navy-Marine Corps Memorial Stadium in 2019, Atlanta will host in 2020, and Denver will host in 2021.

=== Team movement ===
On November 16, 2017, the league announced at The Ford Center at The Star in Frisco, Texas that the Rochester Rattlers would be relocating to the Dallas market to become the Dallas Rattlers.

=== Coaching changes ===
- Atlanta Blaze - After Dave Huntley's unexpected death, former MLL player Liam Banks was named the third head coach in Atlanta's young franchise history.
- Chesapeake Bayhawks - After the team and Brian Reese agreed to part ways after two seasons, general manager Dave Cottle resumed his former role as head coach. Cottle coached the Bayhawks from 2012 to 2015 and won two championships.
- Dallas Rattlers - With the Rattlers' relocation to Dallas, Tim Soudan resigned as head coach of the team. Longtime assistant coach Bill Warder was named Soudan's replacement. Soudan had been the league's longest tenured head coach after 100 games with the Rattlers.

=== Partnership with Women's Professional Lacrosse League ===
In June, the MLL and upstart Women's Professional Lacrosse League, the second pro women's lacrosse league in the United States, will play three doubleheaders. On June 2, the Baltimore Brave (WPLL) took the field in the afternoon before the Bayhawks hosted the Ohio Machine. On June 28, the New England Command hosted the Philadelphia Fire at Harvard Stadium in Boston before the MLL All Star Game. On June 30, the New York Lizards will play a host a doubleheader with the New York Fight.

== Teams ==
Atlanta Blaze	Boston Cannons	Charlotte Hounds	Chesapeake Bayhawks
Fifth Third Bank Stadium	Harvard Stadium	American Legion Memorial Stadium	Navy–Marine Corps Memorial Stadium
Capacity: 8,318	Capacity: 30,323	Capacity: 21,000	Capacity: 34,000

Locations of teams for the 2017 MLL season

Dallas Rattlers	Denver Outlaws	Florida Launch	New York Lizards	Ohio Machine
The Ford Center at The Star	Sports Authority Field at Mile High	FAU Stadium	James M. Shuart Stadium	Fortress Obetz
Capacity: 12,000	Capacity: 76,125	Capacity: 29,419	Capacity: 11,929	Capacity: 6,500

== Standings ==
2018 Major League Lacrosse Standings
	W	L	PCT	GB	GF	2ptGF	GA	2ptGA
Dallas Rattlers	11	3	.786	-	201	8	175	2
Chesapeake Bayhawks	9	5	.643	2	176	11	174	7
Denver Outlaws	8	6	.571	3	225	5	183	14
New York Lizards	8	6	.571	3	211	5	214	5
Charlotte Hounds	7	7	.500	4	196	8	191	4
Atlanta Blaze	7	7	.500	4	187	10	184	7
Boston Cannons	5	9	.357	6	173	9	213	9
Florida Launch	5	9	.357	6	192	4	201	10
Ohio Machine	3	11	.214	8	173	6	199	8

Playoff Seed

== Scoring leaders ==
Note: GP = Games played; G = Goals; 2PG = 2–point goals; A = Assists; Pts = Points; GB = Ground Balls

Player	Team	GP	G	2PG	A	Pts	GB
Rob Pannell	New York Lizards	13	43	0	35	78	24
Will Manny	New York Lizards	14	41	0	21	62	19
Kevin Rice	Atlanta Blaze	14	34	1	26	61	13
Dylan Molloy	Florida Launch	14	41	0	18	59	25
Eric Law	Denver Outlaws	14	40	0	18	58	25
Kieran McArdle	Florida Launch	12	36	0	20	56	20
Matt Kavanagh	Denver Outlaws	13	34	0	19	53	17
Joe Walters	New York Lizards	14	27	0	25	52	13
Jordan Wolf	Dallas Rattlers	12	31	0	20	51	18
James Pannell	Boston Cannons	13	34	0	14	48	14
Marcus Holman	Ohio Machine	12	31	2	15	48	25

== Leading goaltenders ==
Note: GP = Games played; Mins = Minutes played; W = Wins; L = Losses: GA = Goals Allowed; 2ptGA = 2-point goals allowed; SV% = Save Percentage; GAA = Goals against average

Player	Team	GP	Mins	W	L	GA	2ptGA	SV%	GAA
Blaze Riorden	Dallas Rattlers	6	309	3	2	59	1	0.601	11.44
Adam Ghitelman	Atlanta Blaze	9	524	4	5	106	4	0.505	12.12
Niko Amato	Chesapeake Bayhawks	12	645	8	4	133	6	0.537	12.37
John Galloway	Dallas Rattlers	9	539	8	1	116	1	0.511	12.90
Jack Kelly	Denver Outlaws	11	639	7	4	141	10	0.539	13.22

== Attendance ==
For the seventh straight year, league attendance dropped. Only the Rattlers (first season after relocating from Rochester) and Machine posted better attendances in 2018 than the year prior. The Outlaws' Fourth of July game was the only contest all season that drew a five-digit attendance figure.

Team	Total	Average	Change
Denver	54,308	7,758	-16%
Dallas	33,456	4,779	118%
New York	32,912	4,701	-9%
Chesapeake	29,183	4,169	-13%
Boston	26,176	3,739	-23%
Ohio	18,659	2,665	9%
Florida	12,099	2,016	-12%
Atlanta	11,660	1,665	-18%
Charlotte	9,548	1,364	-14%
League	228,001	3,677	-4%

== Collegiate Draft ==
The 2018 MLL Collegiate Draft was held on Wednesday, April 18 at the U.S. Lacrosse Headquarters in Sparks, Maryland. With the first overall pick, the Boston Cannons selected prolific faceoff specialist, Trevor Baptiste, from the University of Denver.

== All Star Game ==
On February 13, the league announced the 2018 All Star Game would be held in Boston at Harvard Stadium on Thursday, June 28. The game featured the MLL All-Stars facing Team USA in preparation of the 2018 FIL World Lacrosse Championship from July 12-21 in Netanya, Israel. On June 27, the league announced that the ESPN family of networks would be airing the game. The next day in front of 6,589 fans, the MLL All Stars defeated Team USA for the first time thanks to seven unanswered goals resulting in a 15-14 overtime victory.

== Playoffs ==
Four teams will make the Major League Lacrosse playoffs. Two semifinal games were played on August 11 at Frisco, Texas and Annapolis, Maryland. The winners, the Dallas Rattlers and Denver Outlaws, advanced to the championship game on August 18 in Charleston, South Carolina at MUSC Health Stadium. The matchup resulted in the Outlaws claiming their third championship in five years after a 16-12 defeat of the Rattlers.

Semifinals; August 11
1	Dallas	15
4	New York	12
2	Chesapeake	12
3	Denver	13

Championship; August 18
1	Dallas	12
3	Denver	16

=== Semifinals ===
==== (1) Dallas Rattlers vs. (4) New York Lizards ====
August 11, 2018; 5:30 PM	Dallas Rattlers	15–12 (6–1, 3–4, 4–4, 2–3)	New York Lizards	Ford Center at The Star; Attendance: 6,124

Game reference

John Galloway
Goalies
Drew Adams

Thompson (Reeves) – 01:42	1–0
Wolf – 05:01	2–0
	2–1	07:50 – Pannell
White – 08:11	3–1
Simoneau – 08:18	4–1
Staats (MacIntosh) – 10:56	5–1
Reeves (Ranagan) – 11:24	6–1
	6–2	16:56 – Bernhardt
White (Wolf) – 19:26	7–2
	7–3	25:00 – Pannell (LoCascio)
Ranagan – 27:04	8–3
Crotty (Staats) – 27:52	9–3
	9–4	29:30 – Pannell (Rabil) (PP)
	9–5	29:52 – Bernhardt (Walters) (PP)
	9–6	32:26 – Rabil (Bernhardt)
Crotty (McNamara) – 34:33	10–6
MacIntosh (Wolf) – 35:03	11–6
Wolf – 36:20	12–6
	12–7	36:56 – LoCascio
	12–8	41:45 – Tinney (Pannell)
Reeves (Staats) – 42:29	13–8
	13–9	43:33 – Manny (SH)
Staats (Crotty) – 48:02	14–9
Thompson (Ranagan) – 51:04	15–9
	15–10	52:10 – Bernhardt
	15–11	58:33 – Manny (PP)
	15–12	58:49 – Unterstein

3.5 min
Penalties
7.5 min
24
Shots
23

==== (2) Chesapeake Bayhawks vs. (3) Denver Outlaws ====
August 11, 2018; 5:30 PM	Chesapeake Bayhawks	12–13 (2–2, 3–4, 3–3, 4–4)	Denver Outlaws	Navy–Marine Corps Memorial Stadium; Attendance: 2,977

Game reference

Niko Amato
Goalies
Dillon Ward

	0–1	12:50 – Bellistri (Young)
Byrne (Thompson) – 07:24	1–1
Stanwick – 08:12	2–1
	2–2	15:57 – Schlosser (Currier)
	2–3	19:48 – Currier (Law)
	2–4	28:32 – Law (Bellistri) (PP)
Jones – 20:41	3–4
Thompson (MacKay) – 22:21	4–4
Danowski (Byrne) – 23:27	5–4
	5–5	29:13 – Currier (Law)
	5–6	32:21 – Currier (PP)
	5–7	36:57 – Currier (Law)
	5–8	43:37 – Bellistri
Thompson (Jones) (PP) – 38:38	6–8
Byrne (Bernhardt) – 38:50	7–8
Thompson – 42:42	8–8
	8–9	45:43 – Law (Bellistri)
	8–10	51:41 – Kavanagh (Law) (PP)
Heacock – 46:08	9–10
Jones – 47:10	10–10
Thompson (Tucker) – 49:29	11–10
	11–11	52:42 – Bellistri
	11–12	56:07 – Kavanagh (Schlosser)
Heacock – 53:47	12–12
	12–13

2 min
Penalties
1.5 min
20
Shots
27

==== (W1) Saskatchewan Rush vs. (E2) Rochester Knighthawks ====
August 18, 2018; 7:00 PM	Dallas Rattlers	12–16 (4–5, 5–5, 2–4, 1–2)	Denver Outlaws	MUSC Health Stadium – Charleston, South Carolina; Attendance: 4,086

Game reference

John Galloway
Goalies
Dillon Ward

	0–1	01:42 – Currier
	0–2	02:37 – Dennis
	0–3	04:38 – Kavanagh
Crotty (Wolf) – 07:16	1–3
Wolf – 10:48	2–3
Staats (McNamara) (PP) – 12:41	3–3
Wolf (Manley) – 12:47	4–3
	4–4	14:26 – Law (Kavanagh)
Ranagan – 15:43	5–4
	5–5	14:42 – Kavanagh (Currier)
Wolf (Crotty) (PP) – 18:37	6–5
	6–6	20:00 – Cloutier (Kavanagh)
Staats (PP) – 21:58	7–6
Staats – 22:57	8–6
McNamara (MacIntosh) – 25:23	9–6
	9–7	26:33 – Schlosser (Bellistri)
	9–8	27:05 – Currier (Kavanagh)
	9–9	27:41 – Schlosser
	9–10	29:09 – Bellistri (Kavanagh)
	9–11	31:05 – Sullivan (Kavanagh)
	9–12	34:15 – Cloutier
	9–13	36:25 – Hawkins (Bellistri)
McNamara (MacIntosh) – 40:21	10–13
Crotty – 44:11	11–13
	11–14	43:04 – Bellistri
	11–15	47:00 – Kavanagh
Thompson (MacIntosh) – 54:53	12–15
	12–16	55:56 – Kavanagh

1 min
Penalties
2.5 min
28
Shots
30
