= Bear Davis =

American lacrosse coach

Kenneth "Bear" Davis is the 2nd and current head coach of The Ohio Machine, a Major League Lacrosse team based in Columbus, Ohio. Davis joined the team on June 24, 2013, and under his coaching in 2014, the Machine improved its regular season record from 2–12 (2013) to 8–6 (2014), and the team continued to improve in the 2015 season, making to the playoffs against the Rochester Rattlers and ending the season with a final record of 9–5.

== Before The Machine ==
Davis graduated from Hilliard Davidson High School in 1992.

Before joining the Machine, Davis coached the boys lacrosse team at Archbishop Spalding High School in Maryland. He also coached at Camp Takajo in 1997.
