= 2013 Major League Lacrosse draft =

General information
- Sport: Lacrosse
- Date: January 10, 2013
- Location: Philadelphia Marriott; Philadelphia, PA
- Network: YouTube

Overview
- League: Major League Lacrosse
- First selection: Peter Baum, Ohio Machine

The 2013 Major League Lacrosse draft took place on January 10, 2013, in Philadelphia, Pennsylvania.

== Draft ==
=== Round 1 ===
Overall	Team	Player	Positions	College
1	Ohio Machine	Peter Baum	A	Colgate
2	Hamilton Nationals	Chris LaPierre	M	Virginia
3	Charlotte Hounds	Tucker Durkin	D	Johns Hopkins
4	Chesapeake Bayhawks	Jesse Bernhardt	D	Maryland
5	Hamilton Nationals	Josh Hawkins	M	Loyola
6	Boston Cannons	Cameron Flint	M	Denver
7	Denver Outlaws	Brian Megill	D	Syracuse
8	Charlotte Hounds	Mike Sawyer	A	Loyola

=== Round 2 ===
Overall	Team	Player	Positions	College
9	Boston Cannons	Scott Ratliff	D	Loyola
10	Hamilton Nationals	Jason Noble	D	Cornell
11	Ohio Machine	Logan Schuss	A	Ohio State
12	Ohio Machine	Marcus Holman	A	North Carolina
13	Ohio Machine	Chase Carraro	M	Denver
14	Boston Cannons	Will Manny	A	Massachusetts
15	Hamilton Nationals	John Haus	M	Maryland
16	Chesapeake Bayhawks	Kevin Cooper	M	Maryland

=== Round 3 ===
Overall	Team	Player	Positions	College
17	Rochester Rattlers	John Ranagan	M	Johns Hopkins
18	Hamilton Nationals	Casey Carroll	D	Duke
19	Denver Outlaws	Davis Butts	M	Loyola
20	Rochester Rattlers	Ryan Clarke	M	Salisbury
21	Hamilton Nationals	James "Garrett" Thul	A	Army
22	Boston Cannons	Lee Coppersmith	M	Johns Hopkins
23	Denver Outlaws	Landon Carr	M	Maryland
24	Charlotte Hounds	Owen Blye	A	Maryland

=== Round 4 ===
Overall	Team	Player	Positions	College
25	Rochester Rattlers	John Kemp	G	Notre Dame
26	Hamilton Nationals	Reid Acton	D	Loyola
27	Charlotte Hounds	Mason Poli	D	Bryant
28	Charlotte Hounds	Matt White	A	Virginia
29	Denver Outlaws	Eric Law	A	Denver
30	Boston Cannons	Jake Smith	D	Massachusetts
31	Denver Outlaws	Roger Ferguson	D	Brown
32	Chesapeake Bayhawks	Dominic Sebastiani	M	Delaware

=== Round 5 ===
Overall	Team	Player	Positions	College
33	Ohio Machine	Dominique Alexander	M	Ohio State
34	Hamilton Nationals	Mike Poppelton	FA	Johns Hopkins
35	Chesapeake Bayhawks	Adrian Sorichetti	M	Hofstra
36	Denver Outlaws	Aaron Prosser	M	Drexel
37	New York Lizards	JoJo Marasco	M	Syracuse
38	Rochester Rattlers	Brett Schmidt	A	Mt. St. Mary's
39	Denver Outlaws	Dante Fantoni	A	Lehigh
40	Rochester Rattlers	David Lawson	M	Duke

=== Round 6 ===
Overall	Team	Player	Positions	College
41	Ohio Machine	Joe Lisicky	D	Lynchburg
42	Hamilton Nationals	Jake Tripucka	M	Duke
43	Charlotte Hounds	Max Van Bourgondien	M	Cornell
44	Rochester Rattlers	Matt Miller	D	Notre Dame
45	Rochester Rattlers	Noah Molnar	M	Lehigh
46	Boston Cannons	David DiMaria	A	Lehigh
47	New York Lizards	John Antoniades	FO	Hofstra
48	Charlotte Hounds	Brian Casey	M	Georgetown

=== Round 7 ===
Overall	Team	Player	Positions	College
49	Ohio Machine	Colin Fleming	M	Massachusetts
50	Hamilton Nationals	Cameron Mann	M	Jacksonville
51	Charlotte Hounds	Michael McCormack	D	Yale
52	Rochester Rattlers	Peter Johnson	D	Yale
53	New York Lizards	Steve Murphy	M	Notre Dame
54	Boston Cannons	Brendan Buckley	D	Army
55	Denver Outlaws	Sam Snow	M	Fairfield
56	New York Lizards	Mark Millen	D	Hofstra

=== Round 8 ===
Overall	Team	Player	Positions	College
57	Ohio Machine	Kevin Mack	M	Ohio State
58	Hamilton Nationals	Nick Doherty	M	Villanova
59	Charlotte Hounds	Kyle Feeney	G	Bucknell
60	Rochester Rattlers	Zach Palmer	A	Johns Hopkins
61	New York Lizards	Jeffrey Tundo	M	Stony Brook
62	Boston Cannons	Quinn Cully	M	Notre Dame
63	Denver Outlaws	Dillon Ayers	D	St. John's
64	Rochester Rattlers	Marshall Johnson	M	Fairfield

== See also ==
- Major League Lacrosse draft
