= Kevin Cooper (lacrosse) =

Personal information
- Nationality: American
- Born: April 7, 1991 (age 34) Annapolis, Maryland, U.S.
- Height: 6 ft 5 in (196 cm)
- Weight: 190 lb (86 kg; 13 st 8 lb)

Sport
- Position: Midfield/Attack
- MLL team Former teams: Charlotte Hounds; Washington Bayhawks, Ohio Machine
- NCAA team: University of Maryland
- Pro career: 2013–

Kevin Cooper (born April 7, 1991) is a professional lacrosse player with the Whipsnakes Lacrosse Club of the Premier Lacrosse League. He played high school lacrosse for Archbishop Spalding High School in Severn, Maryland where he then committed to the University of Maryland. He is the Son of Christopher and Susanne Cooper. Older brother of fellow Terps Brian and Emily. Majored in Letters and Sciences. Cooper was drafted in the 2nd round (16th overall) by the Chesapeake Bayhawks before being traded to the Ohio Machine.

== College career ==
Cooper played college lacrosse at the University of Maryland from 2010 to 2013. He led his team to 2 national championship games in 2011 and 2012 while with the Terrapins, in 2011 and 2012. Cooper finished his collegiate career at University of Maryland with 81 points, 37 goals and 44 assists in 56 games. As a senior, he led the team in points, 42, and assists, 22. He was named to the 2011 ACC All Tournament Team.

== Professional career ==
2014: Cooper played in 10 games this season with 7 goals and 2 assists for a total of 9 points. He had a career day against Denver with 3 goals on the day.

2013: Cooper was named the Cascade Rookie of the week in week 10 of the season. He played in 2 games for the Bayhawks registering 5 points on the year with 3 goals and 2 assists. Scored three goals and added an assists against Ohio (7/6). Had an assist against Denver (7/27).

2018: On October 22, Paul Rabil's Premier Lacrosse League was publicly announced, and with it the pool of players which will be participating in the league's play. Cooper plays for Whipsnakes Lacrosse Club.

== Statistics ==
=== Major League Lacrosse ===
		Regular Season				
Season	Team	GP	G	2ptG	A	Pts
2013	Washington	2	3	0	2	5
2014	Washington	10	7	0	2	9
