= Cerino =

Cerino is a surname. Notable people with the surname include:

- Jorge Cerino (born 1971), Argentine footballer
- Mike Cerino, American lacrosse coach
