= Mike Cerino =

American lacrosse coach

Mike Cerino is an American lacrosse coach and administrator who serves as the Director of Athletics and Special Projects at Spartanburg Day School.

Cerino served as the first head coach in the history of the Charlotte Hounds (Major League Lacrosse) starting in 2011, before moving into the role of General Manager in 2016.

== Career and Honors ==
In December 2024, Cerino was inducted into the Intercollegiate Men’s Lacrosse Coaches Association (IMLCA) Hall of Fame as part of the Class of 2024. He is widely recognized for founding the lacrosse program at Limestone University in 1989 and leading the team to its first NCAA Division II National Championship in 2000. During his tenure as Vice President for Intercollegiate Athletics at Limestone, he oversaw the department's transition into the South Atlantic Conference before departing for his role at Spartanburg Day School.
