= Charlotte Hounds =

Defunct MLL lacrosse team in North Carolina, US

- Sport: Lacrosse
- Founded: 2012
- Folded: 2019
- League: Major League Lacrosse
- Based in: Charlotte, North Carolina
- Stadium: American Legion Memorial Stadium
- Colors: Royal Blue, Tan
- Head coach: Joe Cummings
- General manager: Mike Cerino
- Mascot: Blue the Plott Hound

The Charlotte Hounds were a Major League Lacrosse (MLL) field lacrosse franchise that began play in the 2012 MLL season and ceased operations after the 2018 season. The team played their home games at American Legion Memorial Stadium.

== Franchise history ==
In January 2011 the MLL voted to grant expansion teams to Charlotte and Columbus, Ohio for the 2012 MLL Season. The team's first hire was Wade Leaphart, who was instrumental in establishing the team's identity, sales, marketing and operations, among other things. McPhilliamy and Leaphart launched a Name the Team Campaign, sponsored by OrthoCarolina, the official team physician of the Hounds, and was heavily run via social media – Facebook. First, fans pitched in ideas for the team name and location identity (Charlotte, Carolina, Queen City, etc.) Then, fans voted on the location ID, choosing Charlotte easily over Carolina. The next stage was mostly on the team staff, in choosing 6 finalists for team names and logo prototypes. Fans then voted on those, narrowing it down to the final three, Hounds, Legion, and Monarchs. A final vote was held, and Hounds won by a mere 21 votes over the Legion. On June 21, 2011, the team name was announced to be the Charlotte Hounds and their colors to be royal and tan. On September 29, 2011, the team announced the hiring of head coach Mike Cerino. On February 10, 2012, the team announced the hiring of assistant coaches J.B. Clarke, Chris Phenicie, and Brad Touma.

The Hounds announced on February 7, 2012, that they had signed a landmark deal with WMYT (MyTV12) Charlotte to broadcast 7 of the 14 scheduled games. The TV broadcasts will alternate with the Radio games on WFNZ, with the exception of the home opener and season finale, which will be covered by both stations. WFNZ will air all home games, while WMYT will broadcast the away games as well as the home opener and season finale. The local TV deal with WMYT is the first of its kind in major league lacrosse, as WMYT will be the only local broadcast station in the nation to offer Major League Lacrosse Broadcasts.

On May 12, 2012, the Charlotte Hounds beat the Ohio Machine 18–15 at American Legion Memorial Stadium to earn their first win in franchise history.

=== 2013: Quick start ===
On August 3, 2013, the Charlotte Hounds clinched a playoff spot in just their second season after defeating the Hamilton Nationals, 14–11. On August 24 in the semifinals, Charlotte defeated top seed Denver, 17–14 for their first playoff win and championship berth in team history. Before that, the Denver Outlaws were the first team in league history to complete a perfect 14–0 regular season. On August 25, the Hounds took on the Chesapeake Bayhawks in the Steinfeld Cup. The Hounds lost 10–9 to the Bayhawks, who won their league-record fifth championship.

=== 2014-15: Team struggles ===
The Hounds struggled out of the gate in 2014 starting 1–4. But on June 7, the Hounds defeated the Outlaws again, 18–15 at home. The loss for Denver snapped a 25 regular-season-game win streak for the Outlaws. Charlotte would finish 4–10 in 2014 for the worst record in the team's three-year history. Things did not get better in 2015; the Hounds actually posted a worse record: 3–11, the worst record in 2015.

=== Road to recovery ===
Before the 2016 season, the Hounds announced head coach Mike Cerino would move to general manager, a role held by Leaphart since 2012. Jim Stagnitta was hired as the team's new head coach. They started the year out with three straight home games against the Boston Cannons, Rochester Rattlers, and Florida Launch. As a result, the team got off to a 3–0 start for the first time in franchise history.

On August 6, the Hounds came back from an 11–6 deficit to defeat the Chesapeake Bayhawks, 15–13 to clinch not only their second playoff berth in franchise history, but their first winning record in franchise history at 8–6. On August 13 in Minnesota, the Hounds' season would be ended after a 16–10 loss to the top-seeded Ohio Machine.

In 2017, things would hit a speed bump. The Hounds would get off to an 0–3 start thanks to two meetings with the defending champion Outlaws. Despite being able to win five of their next eight and put themselves in the top four in the league, the Hounds were not able to finish the season strong. Charlotte posted a 6–8 record in their 2017 campaign, finishing in seventh place. One highlight from the year including drafting of Maryland attackman Matt Rambo, who led the Terrapins to their first NCAA championship since 1975 and won the 2017 Tewaaraton Award.

The Hounds began the 2018 campaign at home against the Boston Cannons. Charlotte scored 16 of the first 17 goals, setting many team records in a 25–7 win including most goals in a game, largest margin of victory, and tied the team record for fewest goals allowed in a game. Head coach Jim Stagnitta became the team's all-time leading wins leader on June 9 with a 19–13 victory over Atlanta.

Despite the hot start, Charlotte would fizzle down the stretch. Charlotte played their last "home game" on June 30 against the Atlanta Blaze at MUSC Health Stadium in Charleston, South Carolina, also the site of the year's championship game. They lost the game, 16–10. Charlotte played the Cannons in their last game of the season and lost, 14–7, a point differential of 25 goals compared to Week 1's 25–7 thumping. The Hounds were eliminated that week from postseason contention.

== Season-by-season ==
Charlotte Hounds
Year	W	L	%	Regular season finish	Playoffs
2012	5	9	.357	6th in League	Did not qualify
2013	7	7	.500	4th in League	Won semifinal 17–14 over Denver Outlaws; Lost championship 10–9 to Chesapeake Bayhawks
2014	4	10	.286	8th in League	Did not qualify
2015	3	11	.273	8th in League	Did not qualify
2016	8	6	.571	4th in League	Lost semifinal 16–10 to Ohio Machine
2017	6	8	.429	7th in League	Did not qualify
2018	7	7	.500	6th in League	Did not qualify
Totals	40	58	.408		Total Playoff Record 1-2 Playoff Win % = .333

== Roster ==
2018 Charlotte Hounds
#	Name	Nationality	Position	Height	Weight	College
0	Bill Milone	(United States)	G	5 ft 11 in	185 lb	Pfeiffer
1	Mike Chanenchuk	(United States)	M	5 ft 11 in	180 lb	Maryland
2	Charlie Cipriano	(United States)	G	5 ft 11 in	185 lb	Fairfield
4	Ryan Brown	(United States)	A	5 ft 10 in	190 lb	Johns Hopkins
5	Connor Fields	(Canada)	A	5 ft 11 in	160 lb	Albany
6	Will Haus	(United States)	M	6 ft 1 in	185 lb	Duke
7	Danny Sweeney	(United States)	D	6 ft 3 in	230 lb	Villanova
8	Michael Howard	(United States)	D	6 ft 5 in	220 lb	Virginia
9	Matt Rambo	(United States)	A	5 ft 10 in	210 lb	Maryland
11	Joey Sankey	(United States)	A	5 ft 5 in	160 lb	North Carolina
13	Tim Rotanz	(United States)	M	6 ft 1 in	210 lb	Maryland
14	John Scheich	(United States)	A	5 ft 10 in	180 lb	Catawba
17	Adam Osika	(United States)	SSDM	6 ft 3 in	205 lb	Albany
18	Jake Withers	(Canada)	FO	5 ft 11 in	192 lb	Ohio State
19	John Crawley	(United States)	M	6 ft 0 in	205 lb	Johns Hopkins
20	Brendan Hynes	(United States)	LSM	6 ft 3 in	185 lb	Richmond
21	Kevin Crowley	(Canada)	M	6 ft 4 in	200 lb	Stony Brook
22	Joe McCallion	(United States)	M	5 ft 11 in	200 lb	Penn
25	Dylan Maltz	(United States)	A	5 ft 8 in	170 lb	Maryland
26	John Haus	(United States)	M	6 ft 0 in	190 lb	Maryland
27	Jake Richard	(United States)	M	6 ft 0 in	180 lb	Marquette
28	Michael Ehrhardt	(United States)	D	6 ft 5 in	210 lb	Maryland
32	Adam DiMillo	(United States)	M	5 ft 11 in	190 lb	Maryland
33	Pierce Bassett	(United States)	G	6 ft 3 in	200 lb	Johns Hopkins
40	Kevin Cooper	(United States)	A	6 ft 4 in	190 lb	Maryland
41	Kevin Massa	(United States)	FO	5 ft 10 in	200 lb	Bryant
43	Noah Rak	(United States)	FO	6 ft 0 in	203 lb	Massachusetts
44	Brett Schmidt	(United States)	D	6 ft 0 in	181 lb	Maryland
45	James Barclay	(Canada)	D	5 ft 11 in	195 lb	Providence
48	Tom Noell	(United States)	LSM	5 ft 10 in	215 lb	UNCW
50	Morgan Cheek	(United States)	A	6 ft 1 in	200 lb	Harvard
55	Scott Hooper	(United States)	D	6 ft 1 in	200 lb	Virginia
91	Matt McMahon	(United States)	D	6 ft 4 in	225 lb	Penn

- Regular season 25-player protected roster updated 2018-07-16

== Head coaching history ==
#	Name	Term	Regular season				Playoffs			
#	Name	Term	GC	W	L	W%	GC	W	L	W%
1	Mike Cerino	2012–2015	52	19	37	.339	2	1	1	.500
2	Jim Stagnitta	2016–2018	42	21	21	.500	1	0	1	.000
3	Joe Cummings	2019–	-	-	-	-	-	-	-	-

== Award winners ==
=== Coach of the Year ===
- Jim Stagnitta: 2016

=== Rookie of the Year ===
- Joey Sankey: 2015

=== Most Improved Player ===
- Mike Chanenchuk: 2016

== Draft history ==
=== First round selections ===
- 2013: Tucker Durkin, Johns Hopkins (3rd overall); Mike Sawyer, Loyola (8th overall)
- 2014: Michael Ehrhardt, Maryland (7th overall)
- 2015: Will Haus, Duke (3rd overall)
- 2016: Dylan Donahue, Syracuse (2nd overall), Ryan Brown, Johns Hopkins (4th overall)
- 2017: Matt Rambo, Maryland (3rd overall)
- 2018: Connor Fields, Albany (3rd overall)
