= Florida Launch =

Former American professional men's field lacrosse team

- Founded: 2014
- Folded: 2019
- League: MLL
- Based in: Boca Raton, Florida
- Stadium: FAU Stadium
- Colors: Blue, gold, white
- Owner: Jim Davis
- Head coach: Tom Mariano
- General manager: Tom Mariano

The Florida Launch were a professional men's field lacrosse team based in the Miami metropolitan area. They joined Major League Lacrosse (MLL) as an expansion team for the 2014 season until 2019. The team played its home games at Florida Atlantic University Stadium. The team was owned by Jim Davis, chairman of New Balance, an early investor in the MLL.

== Franchise history ==
=== 2014–2016: New beginnings ===
In November 2013, MLL granted an expansion franchise to Palm Beach County, Florida for the 2014 MLL Season. The formation of the Launch coincides with the dissolution of the Hamilton Nationals, and former National players have become members of the inaugural Launch squad. Former Denver Outlaws assistant Stan Ross was named as the team's first coach.

Ross faced his former team in the Launch's inaugural game on Saturday, April 26, 2014 in their home opener. The Launch lost their first game to the Outlaws 14-10. Josh Amidon scored the first goal in franchise history. The team's first victory came in their second game, an 11-8 win over the Charlotte Hounds.

After coaching the Launch to a combined 13-29 record over their first three seasons, Ross resigned on November 17, 2016. Tom Mariano, former assistant coach for the Chesapeake Bayhawks, was announced his replacement on December 7.

=== 2017: Playoff breakthrough ===
When the 2017 schedule was announced on November 15, 2016, the Launch also announced that their first three homes games would be played at various cities in Florida as a part of their 2017 Florida Tour to grow the game of lacrosse throughout the state. Due to field renovations at FAU Stadium finishing sooner than expected, the Launch scheduled the home opener on May 13, 2017 after playing two games at Spec Martin Stadium in DeLand, Fla.

The Launch started the 2017 season with an unimpressive 2-3 record. On May 28, with the first pick in the year's collegiate draft, the Launch selected Dylan Molloy, attack from Brown University. Molloy, originally from Long Island, boasted record break numbers at Brown University. Following the pick, the Launch rattled off three straight victories, including two over the New York Lizards to match their franchise high for victories in a season with five (only eight games into the season). The Launch would then go on to lose three of their next four, including an embarrassing 17-4 defeat to the Atlanta Blaze.

On July 29, the Launch entered their last game of the season controlling their own postseason fate. At 7-6, they entered Harvard Stadium to play the last-place Boston Cannons, who defeated them in the first week of the season in overtime. The Launch controlled the game for over 37 minutes, scoring the first six goals of the game and led 16-6 more than midway into the third quarter. The tides turned quickly however, and the Cannons rattled off 11 straight goals to take a 17-16 lead with 8:43 remaining. The Launch were able to recover though. Kieran McArdle tied the game a minute and a half later, and rookie Nick Mariano won the game with a goal with less than five minutes to go. The Launch would finally clinch their first postseason berth in team history with an 18-17 win over the feisty Cannons and head into the final week of the season with a bye.

On August 12, the Launch played the Ohio Machine at Fortress Obetz in the team's first ever playoff appearance. Florida kept it close for much of the game, but the eventual-champion Machine were able to separate themselves and defeat the Launch, 18-13.

The next season, the Launch were not able to replicate their success. Despite getting off to a 2-1 start including a dominating 16-7 win over the eventual champion Denver Outlaws, the team finished the season with a disappointing 5-9 record. Dylan Molloy led the team in goals with 41.

=== 2019: MLL contraction and Launch folding ===
On April 1, 2019, the Florida Launch released a statement indicating that the team was folding as a result of a contraction of Major League Lacrosse from nine teams to six.

== Season-by-season ==
Florida Launch
Year	W	L	%	Regular season finish	Playoffs
2014	5	9	.357	7th in league	Didn't Qualify
2015	5	9	.357	7th in league	Didn't Qualify
2016	3	11	.214	9th in league	Didn't Qualify
2017	8	6	.571	3rd in league	Lost semifinal vs. Ohio Machine, 18-13
2018	5	9	.357	8th in league	Didn't qualify
Totals	26	44	.371		Total Playoff Record 0-1 (.000)

== Roster ==
2018 Florida Launch
Number	Player's Name	Nationality	Position	Height	Weight	College
0	Patrick Resch	(United States)	M	6 ft 3 in	200 lb	Duke
1	PT Ricci	(United States)	D	5 ft 10 in	195 lb	Loyola
2	Ryan Drenner	(United States)	M	6 ft 0 in	185 lb	Towson
4	Dylan Molloy	(United States)	A	6 ft 0 in	220 lb	Brown
5	Tyler Warner	(United States)	SSDM	6 ft 0 in	200 lb	Yale
6	Kieran McArdle	(United States)	A	6 ft 1 in	175 lb	St. John's
7	Jules Heningburg	(United States)	A	6 ft 2 in	185 lb	Rutgers
8	Michael Rexrode	(United States)	D	6 ft 0 in	180 lb	Rutgers
9	Tim Barber	(United States)	M	5 ft 10 in	192 lb	Syracuse
12	Jack Concannon	(United States)	G	6 ft 2 in	200 lb	Hofstra
14	Austin Kaut	(United States)	G	6 ft 1 in	200 lb	Penn State
20	Connor Buczek	(United States)	M	6 ft 2 in	190 lb	Cornell
21	Michael Tagliaferri	(United States)	M	6 ft 0 in	205 lb	North Carolina
23	Nick Mariano	(United States)	M	6 ft 0 in	181 lb	Syracuse
25	Alec Tulett	(Canada)	D	6 ft 3 in	185 lb	Brown
30	Michael Noone	(United States)	D	6 ft 3 in	205 lb	Lehigh
37	Ben Williams	(United States)	FO	5 ft 11 in	192 lb	Syracuse
43	Mark Mcneill	(United States)	M	6 ft 4 in	215 lb	North Carolina
44	Steven Brooks	(United States)	M	6 ft 1 in	190 lb	Syracuse
51	Tucker Durkin	(United States)	D	6 ft 2 in	210 lb	Johns Hopkins
55	Bryan Cole	(Canada)	M	6 ft 3 in	190 lb	Maryland
77	Mike Unterstein	(United States)	M	5 ft 11 in	195 lb	Hofstra
88	Jarrod Neumann	(United States)	D	6 ft 4 in	205 lb	Providence
91	Luke Duprey	(United States)	D	6 ft 5 in	210 lb	Duke

- updated 2018-07-16

== Head coaching history ==
#	Name	Term	Regular season				Playoffs			
#	Name	Term	GC	W	L	W%	GC	W	L	W%
1	Stan Ross	2014-2016	42	13	29	.310	-	-	-	-
2	Tom Mariano	2017-2018	28	13	15	.464	1	0	1	.000

== Award winners ==
Most Valuable Player

- Casey Powell: 2014

Rookie of the Year

- Kieran McArdle: 2014

Coach of the Year

- Tom Mariano: 2017

Defensive Player of the Year

- Tucker Durkin: 2017

Offensive Player of the Year

- Casey Powell: 2014

== MLL Collegiate Draft ==
=== First round selections ===
- 2014: Kieran McArdle, St. John's (4th overall)
- 2015: Lyle Thompson, Albany (1st overall); Connor Buczek, Cornell (2nd overall)
- 2016: Matt Landis, Notre Dame (3rd overall)
- 2017: Dylan Molloy, Brown (1st overall); Nick Mariano, Syracuse (4th overall); Sergio Salcido, Syracuse (8th overall)
- 2018: Jules Heningburg, Rutgers (7th overall)
