= Flagler Credit Union Stadium =

Stadium located in Boca Raton, Florida

Howard Schnellenberger Field at Flagler Credit Union Stadium
- The House that Howard Built

- The stadium during a night game, November 2026

- Location in Florida Location in the United States
- Address: 777 Glades Road
- Location: Boca Raton, Florida, U.S.
- Coordinates: 26°22′34″N 80°6′6″W
- Owner: Florida Atlantic University
- Operator: Florida Atlantic University
- Capacity: 30,000
- Executive suites: 24
- Surface: Celebration Bermuda Turf Grass
- Record attendance: 30,991 (Sept. 17, 2022 vs. UCF)
- Public transit: Boca Raton

Construction
- Groundbreaking: 2010
- Opened: October 15, 2011
- Cost: $70 million
- Architect: HKS/Schenkel Shultz
- General contractor: James A. Cummings, Inc./Balfour Beatty Construction

Tenants
- Florida Atlantic Owls (NCAA) (2011–present); Boca Raton Bowl (NCAA) (2014–present); Florida Launch (MLL) (2014–2018)

Website
- fausports.com/fau-football-stadium

Howard Schnellenberger Field at Flagler Credit Union Stadium is a college football stadium located at the north end of the main campus of Florida Atlantic University (FAU) in Boca Raton, Florida, United States. Opened in 2011, it is home to the Florida Atlantic Owls football team and is intended to be the first part of FAU's multi-use development project, "Innovation Village" as a replacement for Lockhart Stadium.

After selecting an architect in 2008, the university began to raise funds for the $70 million facility with the intent to begin construction in 2009. The $70 million stadium was funded through student fees, private donations, and naming rights partnerships, some of which have yet to be determined. After fundraising efforts slowed, the school delayed construction until 2010. The stadium opened when the 2011 Florida Atlantic Owls football team lost to the Western Kentucky Hilltoppers on October 15, 2011.

Starting in 2014, FAU Stadium became home to the Boca Raton Bowl, a college football bowl game which features teams from the Mid-American Conference and in alternating years Conference USA and the American Conference.

Also starting in 2014, FAU Stadium was home to the Major League Lacrosse's Florida Launch until 2018.

The playing surface was named Howard Schnellenberger Field, after the founding coach of the Owls football program, on August 20, 2014. Schnellenberger spent the final 11 seasons of his coaching career at FAU, retiring after the 2011 season.

== History ==
=== Early planning and finance ===
Although initial plans for a new stadium hinted at the possibility of a 40,000-seat domed facility, later plans called for a 30,000-seat open air stadium. The steel stadium would allow for future expansion up to 65,000 seats as well as a roof if needed. The architect for the stadium was finalized in July 2008 when the firms of HKS and Schenkel Shultz were awarded the contract, finishing ahead of Ellerbe Becket and HOK. The new football stadium was projected to cost $70 million. To fund the stadium's construction, FAU secured a $12 million development rights deal with Crocker Partners LLC. In return, Crocker Partners secured the right to develop up to 2,400 new apartment-style beds on the Boca Raton campus; the first phase of 1,200 beds opened the fall 2011. On July 21, 2010, FAU trustees approved $44.6 million finance plan from Regions Bank. FAU Stadium is one of the only collegiate football stadiums in the United States with a 180 degree view of the ocean from its highest seating positions.

=== Construction ===
The school initially expected to break ground in spring 2009 and play its inaugural home game in fall 2010 against the Michigan State Spartans; however, fundraising efforts fell short, and the stadium opening was delayed until fall 2011. Construction managers James A. Cummings, Inc. (a Tutor Perini Company) and Balfour Beatty Construction broke ground in the fall of 2010. Dant Clayton Corporation handled fabrication and installation of the stadium.

=== Opening season ===
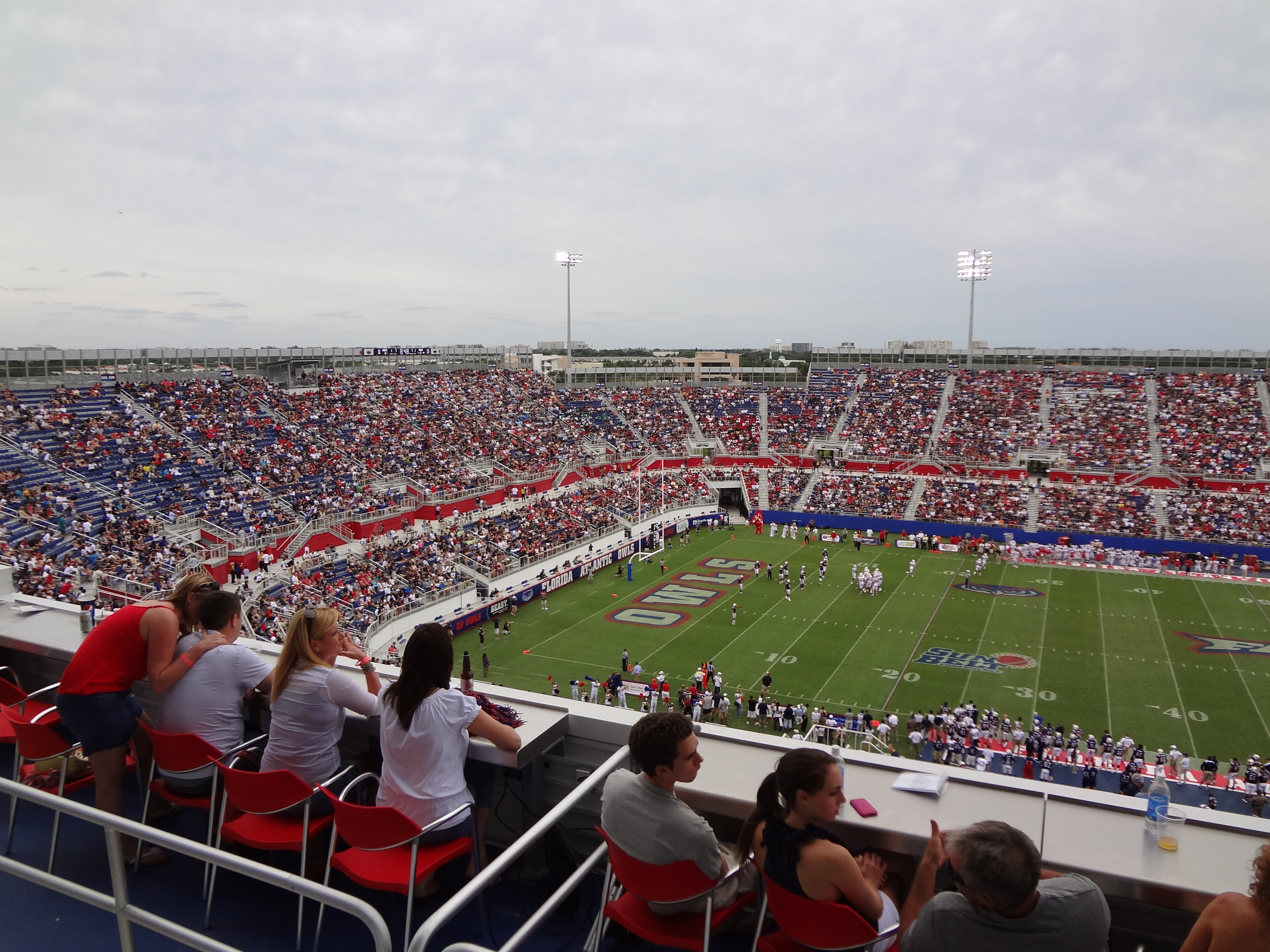
North end zone on opening day, October 15, 2011

The venue opened for the Owls' first home game on October 15, 2011, when the team lost to the Western Kentucky Hilltoppers, 20–0.

The announced attendance for the game was 29,103, although attendance dropped to 16,344 for team's second home game against the Middle Tennessee Blue Raiders. The Owls finished the season with a 1–11 record, its sole win coming against the UAB Blazers on November 26 in front of a home crowd of 12,044.

The team's average home attendance for the year in its new stadium was 17,565, ranking it 103rd among Football Bowl Subdivision (FBS) teams.

=== Naming rights ===
Although the project had acquired approximately $3.69 million through naming rights by June 2011, the school had yet to sell the naming rights to stadium itself by the end of the team's first season in the facility. Originally, FAU aimed for a $1 million-per-year deal, but had dropped that expectation to around $400,000 by the team's first home game of the 2011 season. During halftime at that game, FAU athletic director Craig Angelos stated that the school was "very close" to making a deal.

On February 19, 2013, the school announced that the naming rights to the stadium had been secured for approximately $6 million by the GEO Group, a private prison investor and operator. The $6 million would have been paid over 12 years. The company's chief executive officer, George Zoley, is an alumnus of the school and member of the FAU Board of Trustees. In reaction to the deal, FAU play-by-play announcer Ken LaVicka dubbed the stadium "Owlcatraz". After public pressure from a handful of protests and significant bad publicity, Zoley and FAU president Mary Jane Saunders canceled the naming rights deal.

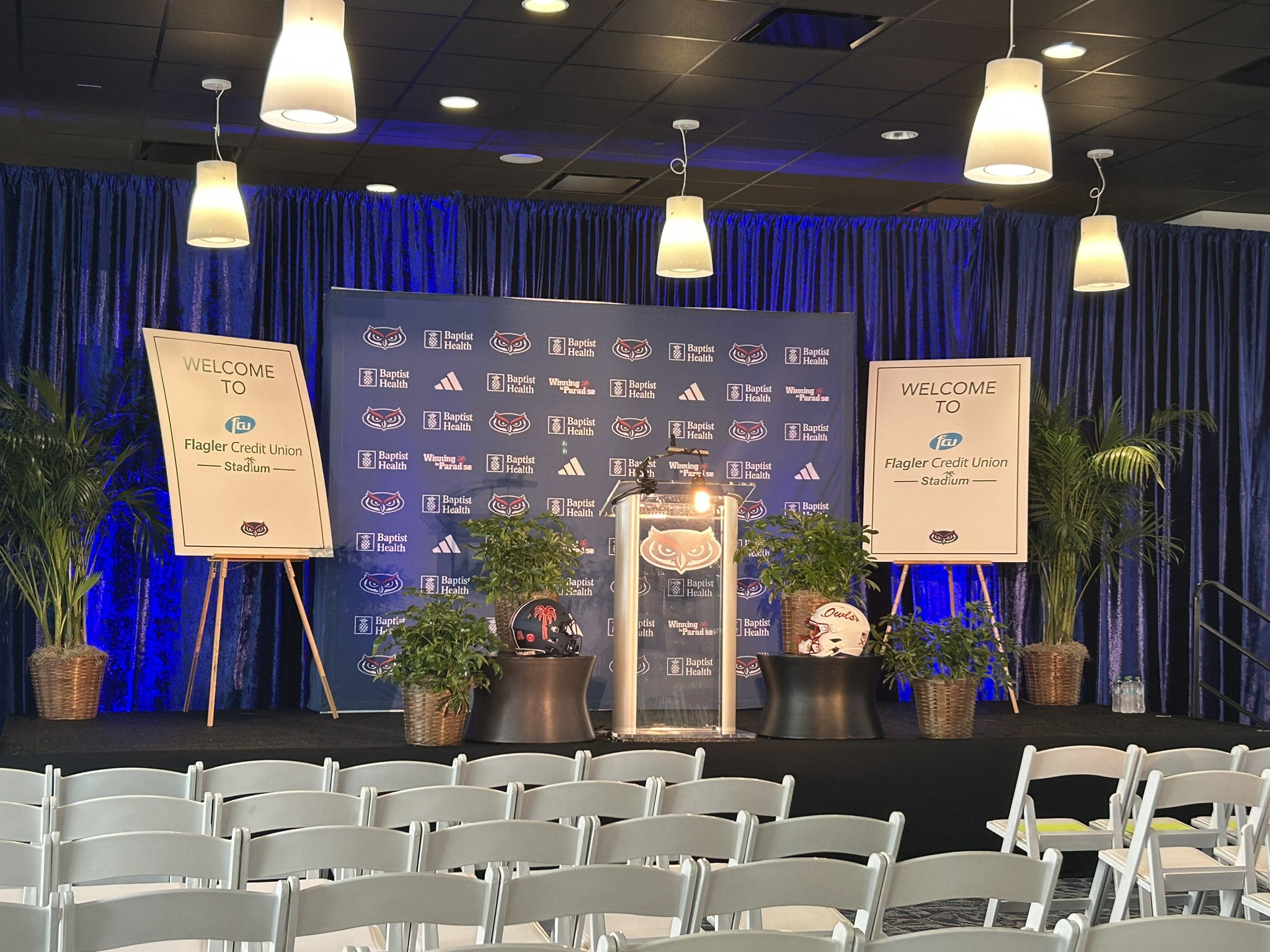
The official announcement and press conference of FAU's naming rights deal of Flagler Credit Union Stadium.

On December 17, 2024, FAU and Flagler Credit Union struck a 15-year naming rights deal worth $22.5 million. It is the largest naming rights deal in the American Conference, and one of the largest in the Group of Five.

== Notable events ==
=== Soccer ===
Date	Team 1	Score	Team 2	Attendance
December 15, 2012	United States women's	4–1	China women's	10,493
May 29, 2013	Ecuador	2–4	Germany	5,500
February 8, 2014	United States women's	7–0	Russia women's	8,857
October 14, 2014	United States	1–1	Honduras	14,805
January 17, 2016	Atlético Mineiro (Brazil)	1–0	(Brazil) Corinthians	N/A
January 17, 2016	Independiente Santa Fe (Colombia)	2–1	(United States) Fort Lauderdale Strikers	N/A

== Structure and facilities ==
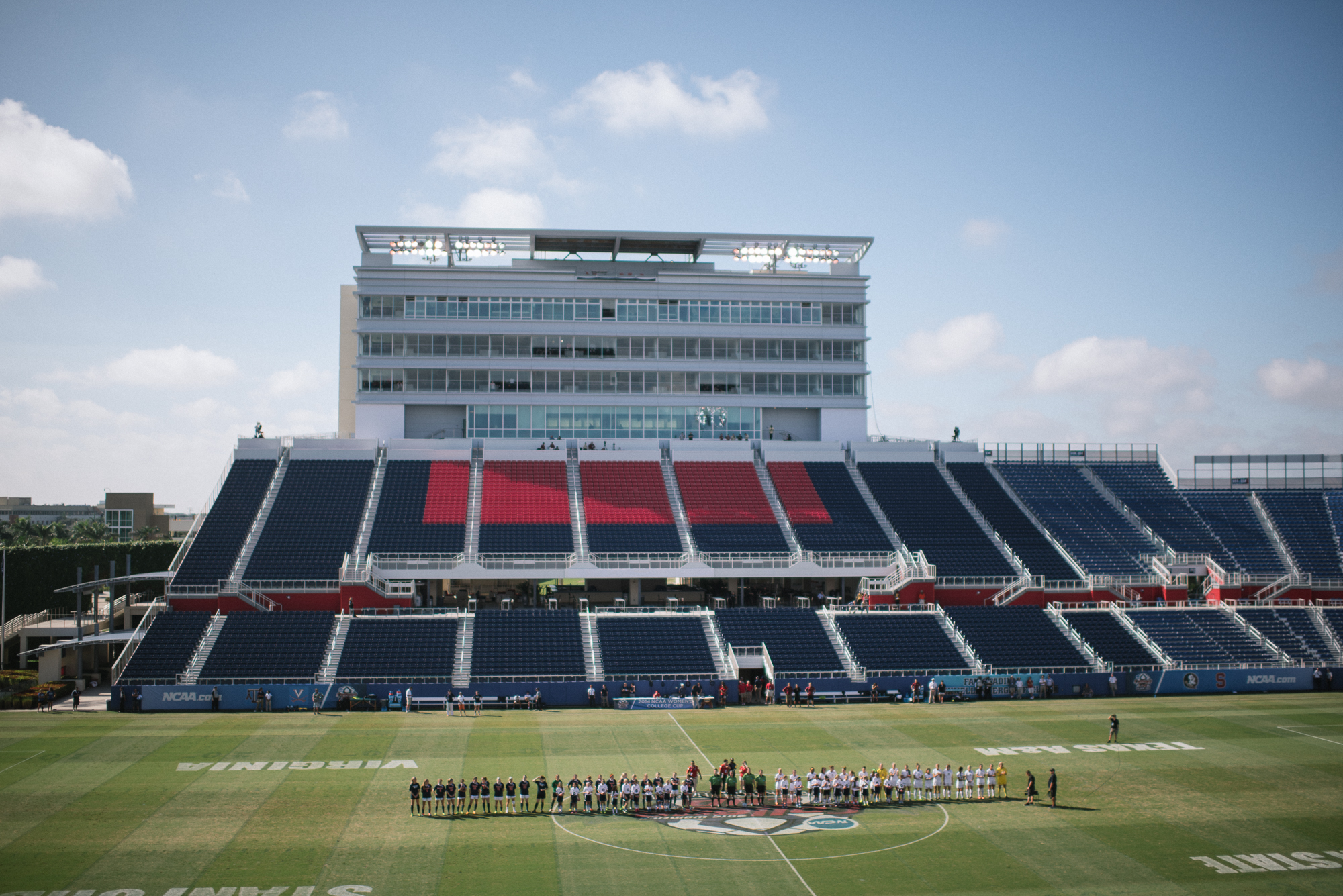
Main stand in 2014

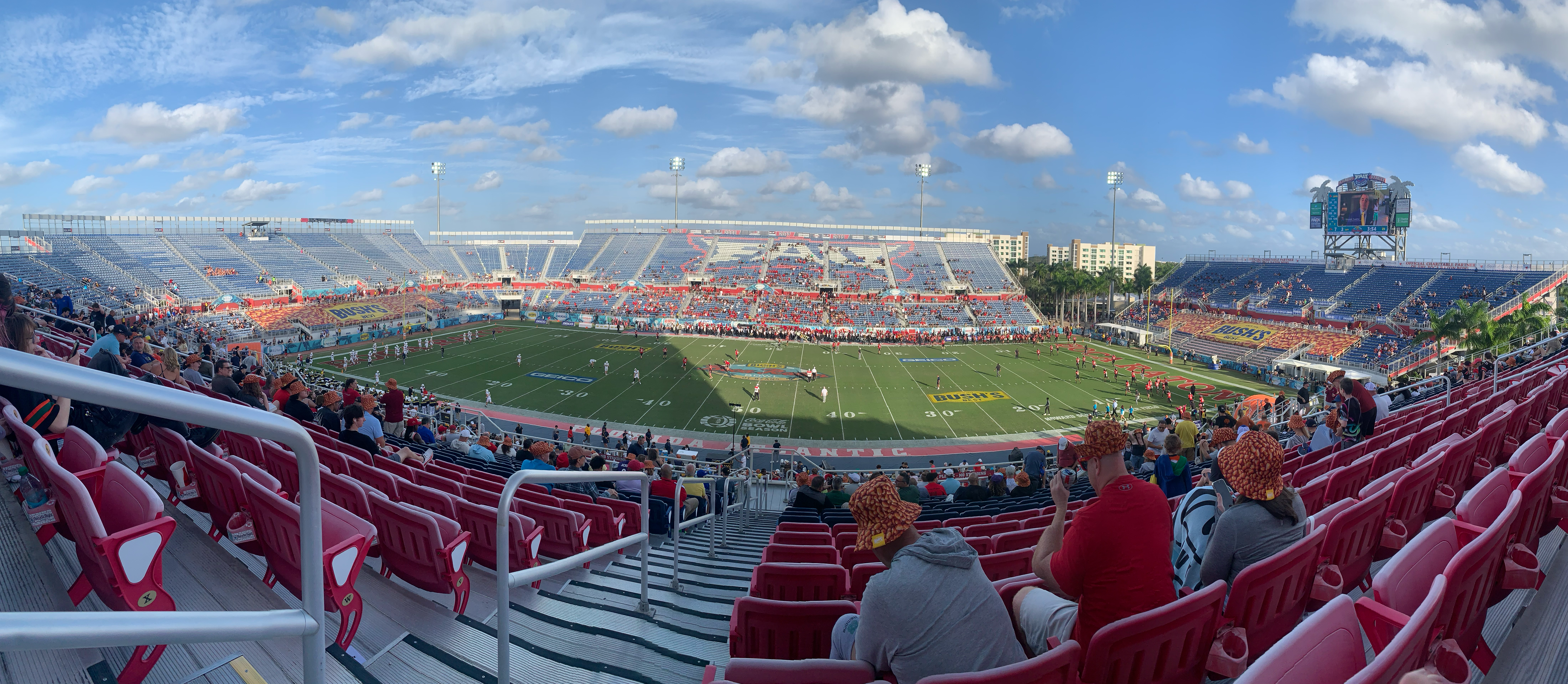
Panoramic photograph of the 2025 Boca Raton Bowl mid-game

The stadium is the first phase of the university's Innovation Village, a multipurpose project which will include four apartment-style residence halls, 130,000 square feet (12,000 m^{2}) of retail shopping space, and a multi-use convocation center for the basketball program modeled after Knights Plaza at the University of Central Florida. The field uses natural turf (Bermuda grass "Celebration"), and while FAU has been in Conference USA for a few seasons now, it was the only home field in the American Conference without artificial turf. The stadium is one of a number of stadiums in Florida which use the same cultivar.

The skybox and press box overlook the Atlantic Ocean; FAU claims that no other football stadium in the United States offers a view of the open ocean. FAU has also frequently used the marketing slogan "1.8 miles from the beach" to describe both the stadium and the university.

== Attendance Records ==
Attendance Record at FAU Stadium
Rank	Attendance	Opponent	Date	Result	Score
1	30,991	UCF	September 17, 2022	L	14–40
2	30,811	UCF	September 7, 2019	L	14-48
3	30,321	Miami (FL)	September 9, 2015	L	20–44
4	29,103	Western Kentucky	October 15, 2011	L	0–20
5	28,481	Navy	September 1, 2017	L	19–42
6	25,912	Akron	December 19, 2017	W	50–3
7	24,726	FIU	October 2, 2021	W	58–21
8	24,283	FIU	September 14, 2024	W	38-20
9	24,116	FIU	November 18, 2017	W	52-24
10	24,101	Air Force	September 8, 2018	W	33–27
Overall Record at FAU Stadium: 45–37

== See also ==
- List of NCAA Division I FBS football stadiums

Preceded by WakeMed Soccer Park	Host of the Women's College Cup; 2014	Succeeded by WakeMed Soccer Park
