= Ohio Machine =

US men's field lacrosse club, based in Obetz, OH

- Founded: 2012
- Last season: 2018
- League: MLL
- Based in: Obetz, Ohio
- Stadium: Fortress Obetz
- Colors: Carolina Blue, Red, White
- President: Ryan Chenault
- Head coach: Bear Davis
- Championships: 1 (2017)

The Ohio Machine was a Major League Lacrosse (MLL) professional men's field lacrosse team based in Obetz, Ohio. They first played in the 2012 MLL season and continued through the 2018 season.

On August 19, 2017, the Machine won their first championship in franchise history by defeating the Denver Outlaws, 17–12. The Machine made the playoffs four times (2014, 2015, 2016, 2017), appeared in the league championship game twice (2016, 2017), and won one title (2017).

== Franchise history ==
=== 2012-2013: Early struggles ===
In January 2011, MLL voted to grant expansion franchises to Columbus and Charlotte, North Carolina for the 2012 MLL season. Both teams were owned by New Balance founder and MLL investor Jim Davis. The league announced on April 12, 2011, the team name would be the Ohio Machine, borrowing the moniker and colors of the team previously located in Chicago. On May 19, 2012, the Ohio Machine got their first win in their franchise history in a home game against the Rochester Rattlers.

On June 24, 2013, two days after a 19–5 loss to the Denver Outlaws, Ted Garber was fired as head coach and replaced by Bear Davis. Garber had led the expansion franchise to a 3–19 record through its first 22 games including a 1–7 start in 2013.

=== 2014-2017: Rise to contention and first championship ===
After putting up only four victories combined in their first two seasons and getting off to a 3–6 start in 2014, the Machine rattled off five straight victories to end the regular season and clinched their first playoff berth. Their streak included wins over the top-seeded Rochester Rattlers and the eventual champion Denver Outlaws. On the road in their first playoff game, the Machine took an early 4–0 lead over Rochester, however the Machine would run out of magic, as the Rattlers came back to end Ohio's Cinderella run, 15–11.

In 2015, the Machine improved upon their previous record with a 9–5 campaign, earning them the second seed. However, they would lose to the Rattlers again in the playoffs, falling 12–8.

Ohio got off to their best eight-game start in 2016 at 6–2. The Machine would stumble and go 1–3 over their next four games but clinch their third straight playoff berth with a dominant 22–13 win over the defending champion New York Lizards. In that game, John Grant Jr. scored ten goals, a single-game MLL record. The Machine had also defeated the Lizards 22–10 earlier in the season at home. The 2016 MLL season saw seven teams finish at 8–6, but due to tiebreaker procedures, the Machine were rewarded with the #1 seed in the postseason.

The Machine defeated the Charlotte Hounds 16–10 on August 13 for the franchise's first playoff victory ever. The next week, they faced Grant Jr.'s former team in the Denver Outlaws, who including the semifinals entered the game on a seven-game winning streak. The Machine took a 9–3 lead before a 97-minute weather delay and a 14–7 lead into halftime but could not hold on, losing 19–18 on a goal by Eric Law with 12.9 seconds left. It was Grant Jr.'s first loss in a Steinfeld Cup game in six trips.

The Machine finished the 2017 season with a 9–5 record and the second seed in the postseason. It was the fourth consecutive playoff berth for the Machine. With the New York Lizards not making the field, that became the longest active streak in the league. On August 12, the Machine hosted the Launch in Florida's first ever postseason game. The Machine prevailed 18–13, advancing to the championship game for the second year in a row. Again, they would face the Outlaws.

On August 18, the league would host its first ever MLL Honors show. Goalie Kyle Bernlohr would win Most Improved Player, and Tom Schreiber would be named the league's Most Valuable Player for the second straight season. The next day, the Machine would compete for a title in Frisco, Texas, at The Ford Center at The Star. With three minutes left in the third quarter, the Machine trailed 10–6. However, Ohio was able to get some offense going and scored three straight to bring it within one heading into the fourth. After Matt Kavanagh scored a goal to make it 12-10 Denver with 10:30 remaining in the game, the Machine would finish the game on a seven-goal run, courtesy of Jake Bernhardt, Greg Puskuldjian, three straight from Marcus Holman, Connor Cannizzaro, and another Bernhardt score. After coming up short in 2014, 2015, and 2016, the Machine would finally break through to win the franchise's first Steinfeld Cup. They would be the first team since Denver in 2014 to win the team's first championship. Marcus Holman, who had four goals and two assists, was named the Most Valuable Player of the game.

=== 2018 ===
In 2018, the team would finish 3-11 during the regular season for last place of the 9 teams.

Before the 2019 season, the league was faced with competition from the Premier Lacrosse League as well as a desire to achieve a "one owner, one vote" structure. Therefore, Major League Lacrosse contracted from 9 teams to 6. Jim Davis was forced to choose to keep only one of the four teams he owned: the Machine, the Charlotte Hounds, the Florida Launch, or the Dallas Rattlers. Davis chose the Rattlers and folded the other three teams.

== Stadium ==
Fortress Obetz was the third and final home of the Ohio Machine. On November 16, 2016, the village of Obetz, a community just south of Columbus, announced they would be constructing a 6,500-seat multipurpose stadium, Fortress Obetz, at the site of the closed Columbus Motor Speedway. It would be ready in time for the Machine's first home game of the 2017 season on May 6. The stadium opened on May 6, 2017, for the home opener of the Machine against the Rochester Rattlers, who beat the home team 12–11 in overtime. It would take three tries for the Machine to finally get a victory on their new home field. The Machine defeated the Florida Launch 19–7 on May 27.

The Machine began play in 2012 on Selby Field at Ohio Wesleyan University and moved to Panther Stadium at Ohio Dominican University for the 2016 season. Panther Stadium is less than half of the size of Selby Field.

== Season-by-season ==
Ohio Machine
| Year | W | L | % | Regular season finish | Playoffs |
| 2012 | 2 | 12 | .143 | 8th in league | --- |
| 2013 | 2 | 12 | .143 | 8th in league | --- |
| 2014 | 8 | 6 | .571 | 4th in league | Lost semifinal vs. Rochester Rattlers 15–11 |
| 2015 | 9 | 5 | .643 | 2nd in league | Lost semifinal vs. Rochester Rattlers 12–8 |
| 2016 | 8 | 6 | .571 | 1st in league | Won semifinal vs. Charlotte Hounds 16-10; Lost championship vs. Denver Outlaws 19–18 |
| 2017 | 9 | 5 | .643 | 2nd in league | Won semifinal vs. Florida Launch 18-13; Won Championship vs. Denver Outlaws 17-12 |
| 2018 | 3 | 11 | .214 | 9th in league | --- |
| Totals | 41 | 57 | .418 | | Total Playoff Record 3–3; Playoff Win % = .500 |

== Roster ==
2018 Ohio Machine
| Number | Player's Name | Nationality | Position | Height | Weight | College |
| 0 | Davey Emala | (United States) | A | 5 ft 11 in | 195 lb | North Carolina |
| 1 | Marcus Holman | (United States) | A | 5 ft 11 in | 185 lb | North Carolina |
| 4 | Ryan Ambler | (United States) | A | 6 ft 1 in | 190 lb | Princeton |
| 5 | Carlson Milikin | (United States) | SSDM | 6 ft 0 in | 195 lb | Notre Dame |
| 12 | Steven Waldeck | (United States) | D | 6 ft 0 in | 210 lb | Stony Brook |
| 14 | Justin Guterding | (United States) | A | 6 ft 0 in | 185 lb | Duke |
| 15 | Peter Baum | (United States) | M | 6 ft 1 in | 197 lb | Colgate |
| 16 | Ryan Keenan | (United States) | A | 5 ft 9 in | 190 lb | Penn State |
| 17 | Jackson Place | (United States) | D | 5 ft 11 in | 185 lb | Bucknell |
| 18 | Kyle Harrison | (United States) | M | 6 ft 0 in | 194 lb | Johns Hopkins |
| 23 | Dominique Alexander | (United States) | M | 6 ft 2 in | 215 lb | Ohio State |
| 25 | Brian Karalunas | (United States) | D | 6 ft 0 in | 185 lb | Villanova |
| 26 | Tom Schreiber | (United States) | M | 6 ft 0 in | 190 lb | Princeton |
| 31 | Kenny Massa | (United States) | FO | 6 ft 0 in | 195 lb | Bryant |
| 33 | Tyler Pfister | (United States) | M | 6 ft 2 in | 185 lb | Ohio State |
| 35 | Kyle Bernlohr | (United States) | G | 5 ft 10 in | 160 lb | Maryland |
| 40 | Pat Harbeson | (United States) | M | 5 ft 7 in | 170 lb | Virginia |
| 41 | Bryce Young | (United States) | D | 6 ft 2 in | 205 lb | Maryland |
| 42 | Scott Rodgers | (United States) | G | 6 ft 4 in | 250 lb | Notre Dame |
| 51 | Dominick Calisto | (United States) | D | 6 ft 0 in | 190 lb | Boston University |
| 58 | Brandon Mangan | (United States) | A | 6 ft 2 in | 185 lb | Yale |
| 79 | Mark Matthews | (Canada) | A | 6 ft 5 in | 235 lb | Denver |
| 77 | Ben Randall | (United States) | D | 6 ft 3 in | 192 lb | Ohio State |
| 81 | Zach Bryant | (Canada) | D | 6 ft 3 in | 195 lb | Robert Morris |
| 83 | Frank Brown | (Haudenosaunee) | A/M | 6 ft 3 in | 215 lb | Hobart |
| 92 | Greg Puskuldjian | (United States) | M | 5 ft 11 in | 205 lb | Adelphi |
| 99 | Evan Connell | (United States) | M | 5 ft 11 in | 190 lb | North Carolina |

- updated 2018-07-16

== MLL award winners ==
Most Valuable Player

- Tom Schreiber: 2016, 2017

Most Improved Player

- Kyle Bernlohr: 2017

== Head coaching history ==
| # | Name | Term | Regular season | | | | Playoffs | | | |
| # | Name | Term | GC | W | L | W% | GC | W | L | W% |
|---|---|---|---|---|---|---|---|---|---|---|
| 1 | Ted Garber | 2012-2013 | 22 | 3 | 19 | .136 | — | — | — | — |
| 2 | Bear Davis | 2013—2018 | 76 | 38 | 38 | .500 | 6 | 3 | 3 | .500 |

== MLL Collegiate Draft history ==
=== First round selections ===
- 2012: Steele Stanwick, Virginia (2nd overall); Robert Rotanz, Duke (8th overall)
- 2013: Peter Baum, Colgate (1st overall)
- 2014: Tom Schreiber, Princeton (1st overall)
- 2015: None
- 2016: Michael Quinn, Yale (8th overall)
- 2017: Connor Cannizzaro, Denver (5th overall)
- 2018: Justin Guterding, Duke (9th overall)
