= Atlanta Blaze =

Defunct MLL lacrosse team in Georgia

- Sport: Lacrosse
- Founded: 2016; 10 years ago
- League: Major League Lacrosse
- Based in: Atlanta, Georgia
- Stadium: Atlanta Silverbacks Park
- Colors: Black, red, gold, white
- Owner: Andre Gudger
- President: Spencer Ford
- Head coach: Liam Banks
- Division titles: None

The Atlanta Blaze were a professional men's field lacrosse team in Major League Lacrosse (MLL). The Blaze became the ninth team in MLL as an expansion team for the 2016 season and played its home games at Atlanta Silverbacks Park in Atlanta, Georgia.

== Franchise history ==
On August 7, 2015, the MLL granted an expansion franchise to Atlanta, Georgia for the 2016 MLL season. The league had previously held several games there before including the 2014 and 2015 championship games which drew 8,149 and 8,674 people (the latter is a Steinfeld Cup record). The league suspended the Blaze for the 2020 season.

=== 2016 inaugural season ===
The Blaze hosted the first game in franchise history on Saturday, April 23, 2016 against the storied Chesapeake Bayhawks. Kevin Rice scored the first goal in franchise history only 44 seconds into the game, and Conrad Oberbeck scored 14 seconds later as Atlanta took a 6-0 lead to start the game. Despite the great start, the Blaze were not able to finish it out and lost 16-13 in front of 4,145 fans. After losing in Boston, the Blaze came back home on May 14 where they smoked the Denver Outlaws for their first win in franchise history by a score of 23-12.

The rest of the Blaze's first year included some very questionable moves. On June 14, the Blaze traded their top draft pick, Myles Jones, to the Bayhawks after Jones had only played two games for the Blaze. On July 21, the team released Hall of Fame head coach John Tucker and replaced him with assistant coach David Huntley after a 3-7 start. The Blaze finished their inaugural season in eighth place at 4-10, ahead of only the Florida Launch. Former Atlanta Hawks and Thrashers executive Jim Pfeifer was named the team's new president on December 29.

=== 2017 season ===
In 2017, the Blaze returned much more competitive. The team still had playoff hopes as they entered the second-to-last week of the regular season, but a loss to the Rochester Rattlers eliminated them. However, they were still able to post an improved 6-8 record. Highlights from the season included a 17-4 drubbing of the Florida Launch on July 1, playing in their first Fourth of July game in Denver, and Kevin Rice becoming the first Atlanta Blaze player to score 100 points in a Blaze uniform.

On December 18, 2017, Blaze coach Dave Huntley died at the age of 60. Former MLL player Liam Banks was named the Blaze's third head coach.

Before the 2018 Collegiate Draft on April 18, MLL commissioner Sandy Brown announced the league had approved the sale of the Blaze to Andre Gudger, founder and CEO of technology and investment company Eccalon. This came five months after former owner Peter Trematerra sold the team back to the league, a move that also included a lawsuit.

=== 2018 season ===
The 2018 summer season was the best season that the Blaze had since their inception, posting a 7-7 record. They were one win away from their first playoff berth, but lost to the Denver Outlaws on the final week of the season to be eliminated.

=== 2019 season and dissolution ===
During this season they had to move to Atlanta Silverbacks Park because their Grady Stadium was being renovated.

After, they ceased operations and were relocated to Philadelphia as the second incarnation of the Philadelphia Barrage.

=== Attendance ===
Despite drawing near sellouts for the 2014 and 2015 Steinfeld Cup championship games, the Blaze have so far failed to draw similar numbers for their home games.

Season	Games	Total	Average	Season High
2016	7	23,194	3,313	4,297
2017	7	14,259	2,037	2,811
2018	7	11,660	1,665	2,326

== Season-by-season ==
Atlanta Blaze
Year	W	L	%	Regular season finish	Playoffs
2016	4	10	.286	8th in League	Didn't qualify
2017	6	8	.429	8th in League	Didn't qualify
2018	7	7	.500	6th in League	Didn't qualify
2019	8	8	.500	4th in League	Semifinalists
Totals	25	33	.431		Total Playoff Record 0-1 Playoff Win % = .000

== Head coaches ==
#	Name	Term	Regular season				Playoffs			
#	Name	Term	GC	W	L	W%	GC	W	L	W%
1	John Tucker	2016	10	3	7	.300	-	-	-	-
2	David Huntley	2016–2017	18	7	11	.389	-	-	-	-
3	Liam Banks	2018–	14	7	7	.500	-	-	-	-

== Roster ==
2019 Atlanta Blaze
No.	Name	Nationality	Position	Height	Weight	College
3	Alex Woodall	(United States)	FO	6 ft 0 in	215 lbs	Towson
6	Carlson Milikin	(United States)	DM	6 ft 0 in	195 lbs	Notre Dame
10	Colton Jackson	(United States)	M	6 ft 1 in	200 lbs	Denver
11	Chris Madalon	(United States)	G	6 ft 3 in	210 lbs	North Carolina
12	Joe Reid	(United States)	M	6 ft 0 in	210 lbs	Denver
21	Liam Byrnes	(United States)	D	6 ft 3 in	195 lbs	Marquette
24	Brendan Sunday	(United States)	M	6 ft 5 in	200 lbs	Towson
26	Christian Mazzone	(United States)	M	5 ft 9 in	165 lbs	Rutgers
29	Brock Turnbaugh	(United States)	G	5 ft 11 in	195 lbs	Johns Hopkins
30	William Nowesnick	(United States)	D	6 ft 5 in	200 lbs	Salisbury
31	Chad Toliver	(United States)	M	6 ft 1 in	200 lbs	Rutgers
32	Shayne Jackson	(Canada)	A	5 ft 9 in	175 lbs	Limestone
33	Matt Whitcher	(United States)	M	6 ft 3 in	200 lbs	York
41	Dylan Gaines	(United States)	D	6 ft 2 in	205 lbs	Denver
43	Erik Evans	(United States)	D	6 ft 4 in	203 lbs	Ohio State
44	Fred Freibott	(United States)	LSM	6 ft 0 in	200 lbs	Ohio State
45	Leo Stouros	(Canada)	LSM	6 ft 1 in	185 lbs	Colgate
55	Bryan Cole	(Canada)	M	6 ft 3 in	175 lbs	Maryland
59	David Manning	(United States)	D	6 ft 3 in	210 lbs	Loyola
83	Randy Staats	(Haudenosaunee)	A	6 ft 2 in	200 lbs	Syracuse
84	Tommy Palasek	(United States)	A/M	5 ft 11 in	185 lbs	Syracuse
91	TJ Comizio	(United States)	DM	5 ft 10 in	165 lbs	Villanova
99	Dylan Maher	(United States)	A	5 ft 10 in	180 lbs	Dickinson

- As of May 10, 2019

=== MLL award winners ===
Rookie of the Year

- Alex Woodall: 2019

Defensive Player of the Year

- Liam Byrnes: 2019

David Huntley Man of the Year

- Scott Ratliff: 2018

== Draft history ==
Collegiate Draft
Year	Round	Overall Pick #	Player	Position	College
2016	1	1	Myles Jones	M	Duke
2016	2	10	Deemer Class	M	Duke
2016	2	15	Tyler Albrecht	M	Loyola
2016	3	19	Greg Danseglio	D	Maryland
2016	5	36	Warren Hill	G	Syracuse
2016	7	53	Case Matheis	A	Duke
2017	1	9	Jake Withers	M	Ohio State
2017	2	18	Garrett Epple	D	Notre Dame
2017	3	20	Christian Burgdorf	D	Denver
2017	3	21	Adam Osika	M	Albany
2017	4	36	Tate Jozokos	M	North Carolina
2017	6	47	Tom Moore	A	Binghamton
2017	9	74	Brian Masi	M	Sacred Heart
2017	10	83	Connor Hanson	G	Kennesaw State
2018	1	2	Connor Kelly	M	Maryland
2018	2	10	Kyle McClancy	M	Albany
2018	3	20	Austin Sims	M	Princeton
2018	4	32	Christian Cuccinello	A	Villanova
2018	5	38	Griffin Feiner	M	Hartford
2018	5	40	Hunter Forbes	FO	Jacksonville
2018	6	47	Erik Evans	D	Ohio State
2018	6	51	Will McBride	M	North Carolina
2018	7	56	Jack Korzelius	M	Dartmouth

Supplemental Draft
Year	Round	Overall pick #	Player	Position	College
2016	1	1	Jeremy Boltus	A	Army
2016	1	7	Josh Dionne	A	Duke
2016	2	10	Hakeem Lecky	M	Syracuse
2016	3	19	Michael Pellegrino	D	Johns Hopkins
2016	4	28	Patrick Resch	M	Duke
2016	5	37	David Planning	M	Ohio State
2016	6	46	Josh Amidon	M	Syracuse
2016	7	55	Johnny Rodriguez	G	Salisbury
2016	8	64	Matthew Poillon	G	Lehigh
2016	9	73	Geoff Snider	M/FO	Denver
2016	10	82	Chase Carraro	M	Denver
2016	11	91	Brendan Porter	M	Rutgers
2016	12	100	Brian Cooper	D	Maryland
2016	13	109	Drew Kennedy	FO	Johns Hopkins
2016	14	117	Rick Lewis	M	Ohio State
2016	15	123	Jonathan Gill	D	Lynchburg
2017	1	2	Callum Robinson	D	Stevenson
2017	3	20	Anthony Kelly	M/FO	Ohio State
2017	3	23	Gunnar Waldt	G	Bryant
2017	6	47	Adam Fullerton	G	Army
2017	7	56	Callum Crawford	M	Dowling
2017	8	65	Craig Bunker	M/FO	Colby
2017	9	75	Jessie King	M	Ohio State
2017	10	83	Henry Lobb	D	Duke
2017	11	92	James Pannell	A	Virginia
2017	12	101	Spencer Parks	A	Towson
2017	Aux.	109	Paul Bitetti	D	Detroit Mercy
2017	Aux.	112	John English	M	Adelphi
2018	1	2	Dylan Donahue	A	Syracuse
2018	2	11	Jack Bruckner	M	Duke
2018	3	20	Jason Noble	D	Cornell
2018	4	29	Chris Madalon	G	North Carolina
2018	5	38	Mike Begley	M	Marist
2018	6	47	Jeremy Noble	M	Denver
2018	7	56	Jeff George	D	Rutgers
2018	8	65	Ryan Kilpatrick	M	North Carolina
2018	9	74	Sam Linares	A	Hofstra
2018	10	73	Nicholas Gorman	D	Towson
2018	11	92	Ronnie Fernando	G	Adams State
2018	12	101	Matt Garziano	M	Albany
2018	Aux.	109	Stephen Ianzito	M	Syracuse
