= Ford Center at The Star =

Indoor stadium at the Dallas Cowboys headquarters

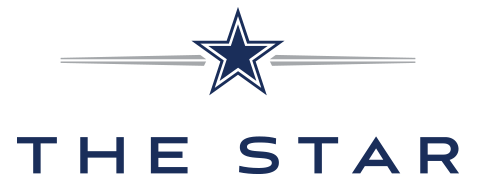

- Tostitos Championship Plaza, at the entrance to Ford Center at the Star. The plaza's field is a miniature 3/5 representation of an official field.
- Interactive map of Ford Center at The Star
- Address: 9 Cowboys Way
- Location: Frisco, Texas
- Coordinates: 33.1105°N 96.8281°W
- Operator: Dallas Cowboys
- Capacity: 12,000
- Surface: Hellas Matrix Helix Turf

Construction
- Groundbreaking: August 22, 2014
- Opened: 2016
- Cost: $1.5 billion
- Architect: Gensler
- General contractor: Manhattan Construction Company

Tenants
- Dallas Cowboys practice facility (NFL) (2016–present); Dallas Rattlers (MLL) (2018–2019); Texas Revolution (CIF) (2019); Frisco ISD football (Note: The Frisco Independent School District stages high school football games as a member of the University Interscholastic League.) (2016–present); East–West Shrine Bowl (2024, 2026); Frisco Bowl (NCAA) (2025); Xbox Bowl (NCAA) (2025)

Website
- www.thestarinfrisco.com

Ford Center at The Star is a 12,000-seat stadium located in Frisco, Texas. It is mainly used as the Dallas Cowboys' practice facility. It is also used for Whataburger's Friday Night Stars, an event every Friday showcasing Frisco Independent School District high school varsity football. The synthetic turf surface is Hellas Matrix Helix Turf. The field's dimensions can also be marked for and accommodate a regulation soccer pitch and lacrosse field.

== History ==
The project was announced in 2013 as a partnership between the City of Frisco and the Dallas Cowboys as part of the "$5 Billion Mile" in Frisco Station, Texas. The Ford Center is part of a 91-acre development called The Star, which includes the Dallas Cowboys' team headquarters and training facility. The Dallas Cowboys decided to move to Frisco from Valley Ranch, Texas, and now uses The Star for their practice games. Hosting a 300-room Omni Hotel, the Dallas Cowboys Ring of Honor Walk, and retail and restaurant space, it is used for multiple events such as high school graduations and football games. Asides from the main stadium, it features practice fields and a sports training complex called the "Baylor Scott & White Sports Therapy & Research center for sports medicine".

In 2015, the Cowboys and Ford Motor Company signed a ten-year deal for naming rights.

== Dallas Rattlers ==
On November 16, 2017, Major League Lacrosse announced it was relocating the Rochester Rattlers to Frisco and the Ford Center as the Dallas Rattlers. The Rattlers, the first professional team to play their games in the facility, played their first home game at the Ford Center on April 29, 2018, against the Denver Outlaws. The Rattlers won the game in overtime, 15–14 with a reported 7,217 attendance. The Rattlers ceased operations after the 2019 season.

== Texas Revolution ==
On December 18, 2018, the Texas Revolution of Champions Indoor Football announced they had signed a three-year lease to play home games at the Ford Center beginning with the 2019 season. However, after three home games in its first season in the arena, the team was evicted. On May 9, the team announced it had ceased operations after the ownership failed to back its financial obligations.

== Other events ==
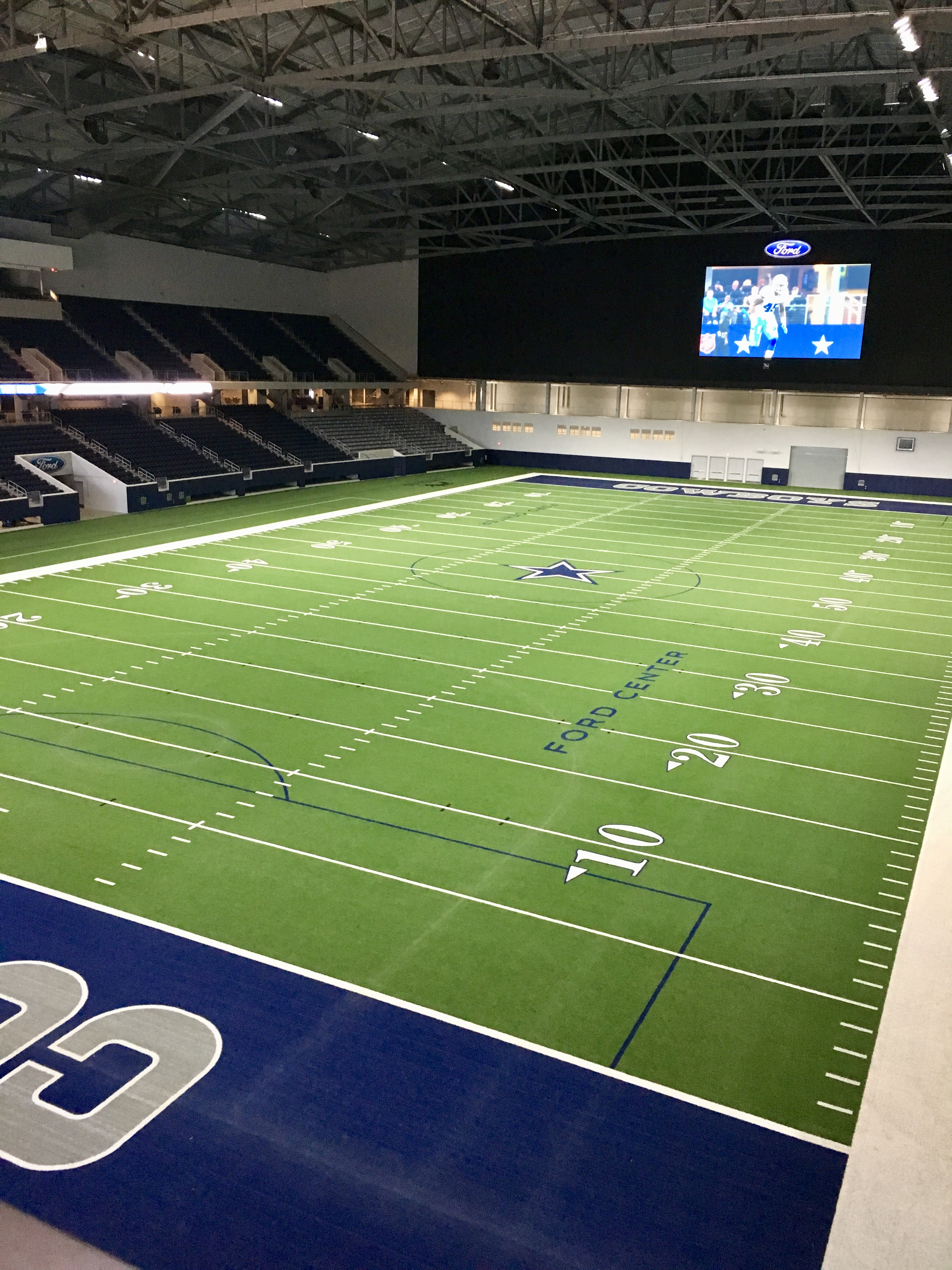
Interior of Ford Center at the Star.

- Major League Lacrosse (MLL) hosted the 2017 Steinfeld Cup, the league championship game for the 2017 season at the Ford Center. The MLL later moved the Rochester Rattlers to the facility permanently for the 2018 season.
- Conference USA held its men and women's basketball tournaments from 2018 through 2023 at The Star in partnership with the University of North Texas, the Dallas Cowboys, and the city of Frisco.
- On June 16, 2018, the venue hosted a welterweight world championship boxing match with Errol Spence Jr. successfully defending his IBF title against challenger Carlos Ocampo. On February 2, 2019, Eleider Álvarez and Sergey Kovalev fought at the arena for the WBO light heavyweight title, for which Kovalev regained his title.
- Bob Seger performed at The Star on March 9, 2019.
- The Alliance of American Football (AAF) was scheduled to hold its 2019 championship game at The Star on April 27, but wasn't played after the league suspended operations on April 2. Sam Boyd Stadium in Las Vegas was originally announced as the host site for the game in October 2018, but the venue was changed in March.
- In June 2023, organizers of the East–West Shrine Bowl announced that the annual all-star college football game would move to Ford Center at The Star for its 2024 playing; the bowl had most recently been held at Allegiant Stadium near Las Vegas. After being played at AT&T Stadium in 2025, the January 2026 edition of the Shrine Bowl returned to Ford Center at The Star.
- The Dallas Open is a men's indoor hardcourt tennis tournament as part of the ATP Tour. The tournament was relocated there from Uniondale, New York where it was known as the New York Open.
