= Dallas Rattlers =

American lacrosse franchise

- Sport: Lacrosse
- Founded: 2001
- League: Major League Lacrosse
- Based in: Frisco, Texas
- Stadium: Ford Center at The Star
- Colors: Dark blue, orange, silver
- Owner: Jim Davis
- President: Bill Goren
- Head coach: Bill Warder
- League titles: (1) 2008
- Division titles: 2004, 2008
- Website: dallasrattlers.com

The Dallas Rattlers were a professional men's field lacrosse team as a member of Major League Lacrosse (MLL) based in the Dallas–Fort Worth metroplex starting in 2018. The franchise was a charter member of the MLL, operating as the Rochester Rattlers in Rochester, New York, from 2001 to 2008 and 2011 to 2017.

After the 2008 season, the team was dissolved. The Rattlers' staff and roster was transferred to the new Toronto Nationals franchise, but the history, colors, and name of the Rattlers franchise remained in Rochester so that they could be used for a future MLL team. After a two-year absence, the Chicago Machine moved to Rochester to play the 2011 season under the Rattlers name.

On November 16, 2017, the franchise announced that it was relocating to Frisco, a northern suburb of Dallas, and would be known as the Dallas Rattlers. The team is owned by Jim Davis, founder and chairman of New Balance.

The league suspended the Rattlers for the 2020 season while retaining the rights to the team branding to possibly return at a later date. Most of the players and team staff were transferred to the expansion Connecticut Hammerheads.

== Franchise history ==
=== Rochester Rattlers ===
In 2001 and 2002 the team played home games at Frontier Field. They played at Bishop Kearney Field from 2003 to 2005, and moved into the new PAETEC Park in 2006. In April 2015, negotiations between the Rattlers and Sahlen's Stadium in Rochester fell through, resulting in the team moving its home field to Eunice Kennedy Shriver Stadium on the campus of SUNY Brockport. They returned to the city of Rochester for the 2016 season, using Wegmans Stadium at the Aquinas Institute as their home field. In 2017, they announced a return to the city's professional soccer stadium, now under new ownership and known as Marina Auto Stadium.

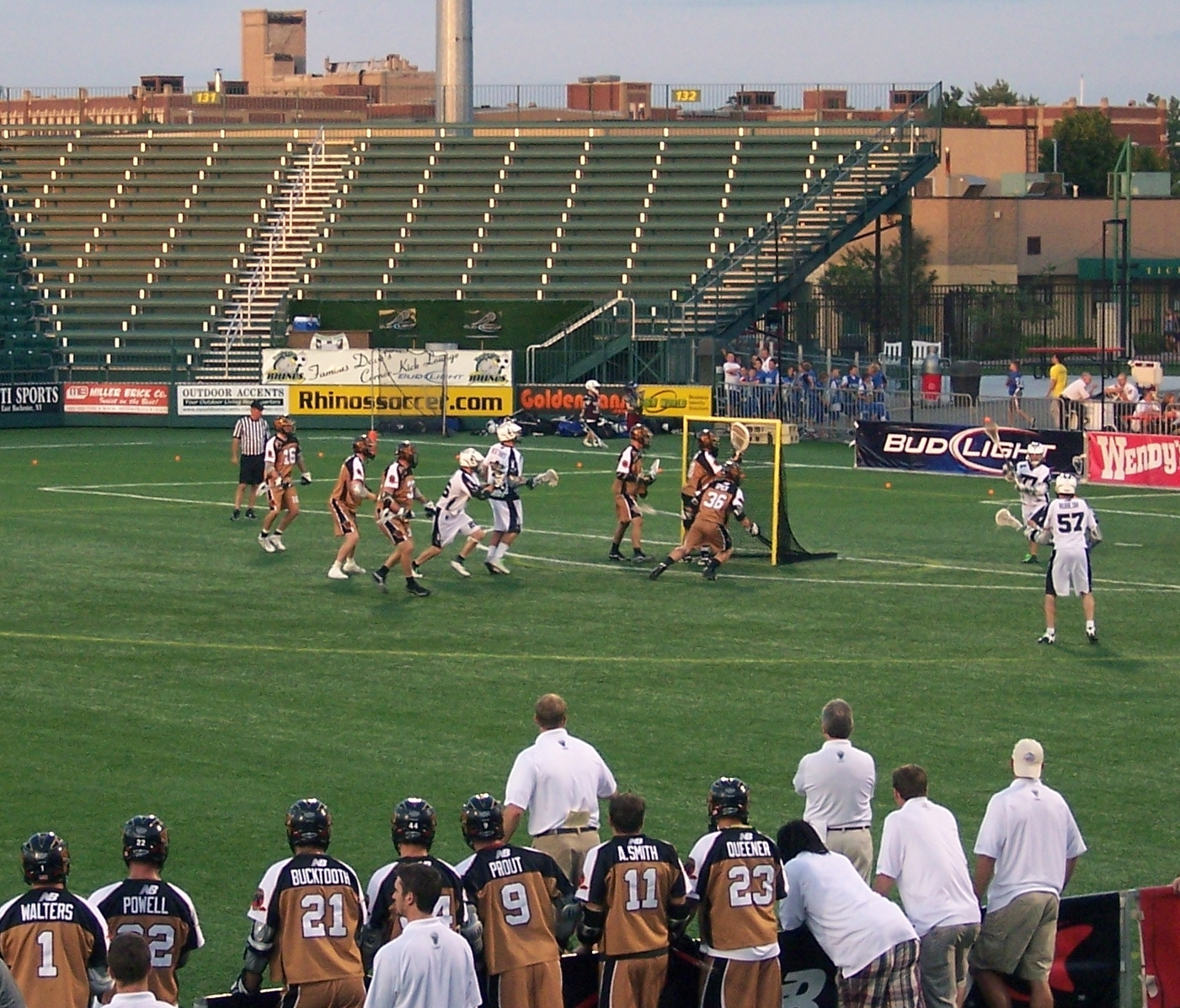
The Rochester Rattlers (orange) vs. the Long Island Lizards (white) at PAETEC Park in 2008.

The Rattlers made the playoffs in 2001 and 2005 as a wildcard. They were the National Division champions in 2004. On June 16, 2007, the Rochester Rattlers won a 27–26 (in overtime) game over the Denver Outlaws in the highest scoring game in MLL history at INVESCO Field at Mile High.

In 2008, the Rattlers won their first and only MLL championship by defeating the Philadelphia Barrage 16–15 in overtime in the semifinals and the Denver Outlaws 16–6 in the championship game.

After the 2008 season, the team was dissolved and the rights to the team were sold to a Toronto, Ontario-based group on February 19, 2009. The Rattlers' staff and roster was transferred to the new Toronto franchise, named the Toronto Nationals; however, the Rattlers' history, team colors, and name remained in Rochester, thus allowing the Chicago Machine to be re-branded as the Rochester Rattlers in time for the 2011 season.

=== Dallas Rattlers ===
On November 16, 2017 the league announced that the Rattlers would be relocating to the Dallas market for the 2018 season and become the Dallas Rattlers. It was announced that head coach Tim Soudan would not be joining the team in Texas and instead Bill Warder, a long-time assistant coach for the Rattlers, would be the head coach. Warder and the rest of the Rattlers would play and win their first game as the new Dallas Rattlers on April 21 at Navy-Marine Corps Memorial Stadium in a 15–9 defeat of the Chesapeake Bayhawks.

The Rattlers would finish first place in the league at 11–3, becoming the first team since the 2015 New York Lizards to win a double-digit number of games. They also finished a league-best 6–1 at their new home in Frisco, where they finished second place in the league in attendance. Five of the seven home games in the regular season were decided by one goal.

On August 11, the Rattlers hosted their former in-state rival Lizards in Frisco. The Lizards were the only team to defeat the Rattlers at home in the regular season, just two weeks prior. However, the Rattlers used a balanced attack and a crowd of over 6,000 people to fuel them to a 15–12 victory. The win lifted them to a championship game appearance in their first season in Dallas, and fourth appearance in franchise history.

The championship game was held on August 18 in Charleston, South Carolina at MUSC Health Stadium. The Rattlers would face the third-seeded Denver Outlaws, who defeated the team in the 2014 championship game. After grabbing a 9–6 lead midway through the second quarter, Dallas would suffer a 15-minute scoreless drought while the Outlaws went on a 7–0 run. The Rattlers would never recover and ended up dropping the contest, 16–12. The night before, Bill Warder was named Coach of the Year, John Galloway was named Co-Goalie of the Year, and Matt Dunn was named Defensive Player of the Year.

==== 2019: New blood ====
Like many other teams in the league, when the Premier Lacrosse League was formed, the Rattlers found themselves having to replace a number of star players, including many that had played with each other for several years in Rochester. Key returners that would take upon bigger roles on and off the field in 2019 would include Ryan McNamara, Zack Greer, Donny Moss, Mike Lazore, Jack Curran, and Cody Radziewicz. The Rattlers would also pick up Dallas native Bryce Wasserman in the offseason. Dallas product Christian Carson-Banister would also start the season in goal for the team in his first Major League Lacrosse appearances.

Dallas stumbled out of the gates, starting a league-worst 0-7. However, midseason acquisitions of rookies Sean Sconone (goalie) and Bradley Voigt (attack), as well as veterans Kyle Buchanan and Adam Osika proved wonders. The Rattlers picked up their first win of the season, 11-8 at Broncos Stadium at Mile High against the Denver Outlaws in the last week before the All Star Break. Sconone made his name known with 20 saves. This would start a streak of six straight victories that would result in the Rattlers on the doorstep of a playoff berth. During the streak, the Rattlers would beat every team in the league, win four on the road, and defeat three first-place teams (all on the road).

Despite owning their playoff destiny heading into the last homestand of the season, the Rattlers would lose two one-goal games to New York and Atlanta officially eliminating them from postseason contention. Dallas would finish 7-9 and miss out on the playoffs for just the second time in six years.

== Season-by-season ==
Year	W	L	%	Regular season finish	Playoffs
Rochester Rattlers
2001	8	6	.571	2nd in National Division	Lost semifinal, 13–12, to Lizards
2002	6	8	.429	3rd in National Division	—
2003	5	7	.417	3rd in National Division	—
2004	7	5	.583	1st in National Division	Lost semifinal, 18–17, (OT) to Barrage
2005	6	6	.500	2nd in National Division	Lost semifinal, 20–13, to Bayhawks
2006	5	7	.417	5th in Eastern Conference	—
2007	9	3	.750	2nd in Eastern Conference	Lost semifinal, 15–14, to Riptide
2008	9	3	.750	1st in Eastern Conference	Won semifinal, 16–15, (OT) over Barrage; Won championship, 16–6, over Outlaws
2009	Did not play
2010	Did not play
2011	2	10	.167	6th in league	—
2012	7	7	.500	5th in league	—
2013	6	8	.429	5th in league	—
2014	10	4	.714	1st in league	Won semifinal, 15–11, over Machine; Lost championship, 11–12 to Outlaws
2015	8	6	.571	3rd in League	Won semifinal, 12–8, over Machine; Lost championship, 12–15 to Lizards
2016	8	6	.571	5th in League	—
2017	8	6	.571	4th in League	Lost semifinal, 8–15 to Denver Outlaws
Dallas Rattlers
2018	11	3	.786	1st in League	Won semifinal, 15–12 over New York Lizards; Lost championship, 12–16 to Denver Outlaws
2019	7	9	.438	5th in League	-
Totals	122	104	.540		Total Playoff Record 5–8; Playoff Win % = .385

== Roster ==
2018 Dallas Rattlers
Number	Player's Name	Nationality	Position	Height	Weight	College
2	Jack Near	(United States)	M	6 ft 3 in	175 lb	Notre Dame
3	Christian Carson-Banister	(United States)	G	6 ft 1 in	220 lb	Boston University
4	John LoCascio	(United States)	D	5 ft 10 in	190 lb	Villanova
5	Mike Manley	(United States)	D	6 ft 1 in	204 lb	Duke
9	John Moderski	(United States)	D	5 ft 9 in	160 lb	Villanova
10	Blaze Riorden	(United States)	G	6 ft 0 in	215 lb	Albany
11	Joel White	(United States)	D	6 ft 1 in	186 lb	Syracuse
12	Conor Gately	(United States)	A	6 ft 1 in	190 lb	Marquette
14	Jack Curran	(United States)	M	6 ft 0 in	185 lb	Villanova
15	John Galloway	(United States)	G	6 ft 0 in	188 lb	Syracuse
17	Drew Simoneau	(United States)	FO	5 ft 7 in	185 lb	Nazareth
18	Chris Bocklet	(United States)	A	6 ft 0 in	182 lb	Virginia
22	Ned Crotty	(United States)	A	6 ft 2 in	185 lb	Duke
23	Cody Radziewicz	(United States)	M	6 ft 0 in	180 lb	Johns Hopkins
24	Mike Lazore	(Haudenosaunee)	M	6 ft 2 in	185 lb	Hobart
25	Ben Reeves	(United States)	M	6 ft 2 in	205 lb	Yale
29	Jordan MacIntosh	(Canada)	M	6 ft 2 in	195 lb	RIT
31	John Ranagan	(United States)	M	6 ft 3 in	218 lb	Johns Hopkins
32	Jordan Wolf	(United States)	A	5 ft 9 in	170 lb	Duke
33	Matt Dunn	(United States)	D	6 ft 3 in	215 lb	Maryland
35	Jordan Stevens	(United States)	D	6 ft 1 in	195 lb	Cornell
37	Mike O'Neil	(United States)	M	6 ft 0 in	170 lb	Cornell
40	John Lade	(United States)	D	5 ft 10 in	195 lb	Syracuse
44	Brian Kormondy	(United States)	M	5 ft 11 in	175 lb	Delaware
45	Randy Staats	(Haudenosaunee)	A	6 ft 2 in	200 lb	Syracuse
46	John Sexton	(United States)	LSM	5 ft 11 in	210 lb	Notre Dame
80	Donny Moss	(United States)	D	6 ft 2 in	200 lb	Adelphi
81	Ryan McNamara	(United States)	A	5 ft 8 in	185 lb	Marquette
88	Zack Greer	(Canada)	A	6 ft 2 in	190 lb	Duke
91	Ty Thompson	(Haudenosaunee)	A	6 ft 0 in	185 lb	Albany

=== MLL Award Winners ===
Most Valuable Player

- Ryan Powell: 2001
- John Grant Jr.: 2007, 2008

Rookie of the Year

- Adam Doneger: 2003
- Alex Smith: 2007

Coach of the Year

- Tim Soudan: 2014
- Bill Warder: 2018

Defensive Player of the Year

- Brodie Merrill: 2006, 2007, 2008
- Michael Manley: 2014, 2016
- Joel White: 2016
- Matt Dunn: 2018

Offensive Player of the Year

- John Grant Jr.: 2001, 2007, 2008
- Casey Powell: 2005
- Jordan Wolf: 2015

Goalie of the Year

- John Galloway: 2014, 2016, 2018
- Sean Sconone: 2019

Most Improved Player

- Andrew Combs: 2005
- Justin Turri: 2014

== Coaches and others ==
#	Name	Term	Regular season				Playoffs			
#	Name	Term	GC	W	L	W%	GC	W	L	W%
Rochester Rattlers
1	Guy Van Arsdale	2001–2003	40	19	21	.475	1	0	1	.000
2	B.J. O'Hara	2004–2008, 2011	66	36	30	.545	5	2	3	.400
3	Tim Soudan	2011– 2017	90	49	41	.544	5	2	3	.400
Dallas Rattlers
4	Bill Warder	2018–	30	18	12	.600	2	1	1	.500
