= 2017 Florida Launch season =

2017 Florida Launch
- League: Major League Lacrosse
- 2017 record: 8-6
- General Manager: Brian Clinton
- Coach: Tom Mariano
- Arena: FAU Stadium
- Average attendance: 2,298

The 2017 Florida Launch season is the fourth season for the Florida Launch of Major League Lacrosse. The Launch will try to improve upon their franchise and league-worst 3-11 record in 2016. It will be their first season under head coach Tom Mariano after Stan Ross resigned. Due to a renovation to FAU Stadium, the Launch will play their first two home games of the season at Spec Martin Stadium in Deland in partnership with Stetson University.

On July 29, the Launch defeated the Boston Cannons 18-17 to clinch the franchise's first playoff spot and winning record at 8-6. On August 12, Florida's season came to an end in their first ever playoff game, 18-13 to the Ohio Machine.

== Schedule ==
=== Regular season ===
Date	Opponent	Stadium	Result	Attendance	Record
April 22	Boston Cannons	Spec Martin Stadium (Deland, FL)	L 17-18 (OT)	1,827	0-1
April 29	Rochester Rattlers	Spec Martin Stadium (Deland, FL)	W 12-10	1,764	1-1
May 13	Denver Outlaws	FAU Stadium	L 8-15	2,208	1-2
May 20	at Rochester Rattlers	Rochester Rhinos Stadium	W 9-8 (OT)	1,744	2-2
May 27	at Ohio Machine	Fortress Obetz	L 7-19	1,028	2-3
June 2	at New York Lizards	James M. Shuart Stadium	W 13-10	4,195	3-3
June 10	New York Lizards	FAU Stadium	W 15-14 (OT)	2,337	4-3
June 17	Atlanta Blaze	FAU Stadium	W 19-16	3,728	5-3
June 24	at Charlotte Hounds	American Legion Memorial Stadium	L 14-18	1,688	5-4
July 1	at Atlanta Blaze	Fifth Third Bank Stadium	L 4-17	2,288	5-5
July 15	Chesapeake Bayhawks	FAU Stadium	W 20-19	2,143	6-5
July 20	at Chesapeake Bayhawks	Navy–Marine Corps Memorial Stadium	L 10-18	4,420	6-6
July 22	Charlotte Hounds	FAU Stadium	W 18-12	2,079	7-6
July 29	at Boston Cannons	Harvard Stadium	W 18-17	5,579	8-6

=== Postseason ===
Date	Round	Opponent	Stadium	Result	Attendance
August 12	Semifinal	Ohio Machine	Fortress Obetz	L 13-18	2,282

== Standings ==
2017 Major League Lacrosse Standings
	W	L	PCT	GB	GF	2ptGF	GA	2ptGA
Denver Outlaws	9	5	.643	-	199	5	174	6
Ohio Machine	9	5	.643	-	195	2	163	6
Florida Launch	8	6	.571	1	179	5	202	9
Rochester Rattlers	8	6	.571	1	182	2	171	3
New York Lizards	7	7	.500	2	183	7	198	4
Chesapeake Bayhawks	7	7	.500	2	211	9	206	1
Charlotte Hounds	6	8	.429	3	184	9	189	5
Atlanta Blaze	6	8	.429	3	182	6	189	8
Boston Cannons	3	11	.214	6	189	7	212	9

Playoff Seed
