= 2017 Charlotte Hounds season =

2017 Charlotte Hounds
- League: Major League Lacrosse
- 2017 record: 6-8
- General Manager: Mike Cerino
- Coach: Jim Stagnitta
- Arena: American Legion Memorial Stadium
- Average attendance: 1,586

The 2017 Charlotte Hounds season was the sixth season for the Charlotte Hounds of Major League Lacrosse. The Hounds came in trying to improve upon their 8–6 record in 2016, when they earned their second playoff berth in franchise history but lost to the Ohio Machine in the semifinals, 16–10. This was head coach's Jim Stagnitta's second season in charge, after leading the Hounds to their first ever winning season in 2016.

The Hounds remaining in the playoff hunt entering the final week of the regular season needing a win and a loss by Rochester. The Hounds got neither, as they finished the season 6-8 and seventh in the standings.

== Schedule ==
=== Regular season ===
Date	Opponent	Stadium	Result	Attendance	Record
April 22	Denver Outlaws	American Legion Memorial Stadium	L 12–13	1,624	0–1
April 29	Ohio Machine	American Legion Memorial Stadium	L 12–15	1,073	0–2
May 7	at Denver Outlaws	Sports Authority Field at Mile High	L 7–11	4,159	0–3
May 11	at Rochester Rattlers	Rochester Rhinos Stadium	W 14–10	1,736	1–3
May 13	Chesapeake Bayhawks	American Legion Memorial Stadium	L 16–18	1,693	1–4
May 20	at Ohio Machine	Fortress Obetz	W 10–8	2,810	2–4
June 3	at Atlanta Blaze	Fifth Third Bank Stadium	L 18–19	2,811	2–5
June 10	Atlanta Blaze	American Legion Memorial Stadium	W 18–12	1,096	3–5
June 16	at Chesapeake Bayhawks	Navy–Marine Corps Memorial Stadium	W 15–14	4,615	4–5
June 24	Florida Launch	American Legion Memorial Stadium	W 18–14	1,688	5-5
July 15	New York Lizards	American Legion Memorial Stadium	L 11–14	2,156	5–6
July 22	at Florida Launch	FAU Stadium	L 12–18	2,079	5–7
July 27	Boston Cannons	American Legion Memorial Stadium	W 16–12	1,775	6–7
August 5	at New York Lizards	James M. Shuart Stadium	L 14–17	6,758	6–8

== Standings ==
2017 Major League Lacrosse Standings
	W	L	PCT	GB	GF	2ptGF	GA	2ptGA
Denver Outlaws	9	5	.643	-	199	5	174	6
Ohio Machine	9	5	.643	-	195	2	163	6
Florida Launch	8	6	.571	1	179	5	202	9
Rochester Rattlers	8	6	.571	1	182	2	171	3
New York Lizards	7	7	.500	2	183	7	198	4
Chesapeake Bayhawks	7	7	.500	2	211	9	206	1
Charlotte Hounds	6	8	.429	3	184	9	189	5
Atlanta Blaze	6	8	.429	3	182	6	189	8
Boston Cannons	3	11	.214	6	189	7	212	9

Playoff Seed
