= 2017 Boston Cannons season =

2017 Boston Cannons
- League: Major League Lacrosse
- 2017 record: 3-11
- General Manager: Kevin Barney
- Coach: Sean Quirk
- Arena: Harvard Stadium
- Average attendance: 4,852

The 2017 Boston Cannons season was the seventeenth season for the Boston Cannons of Major League Lacrosse. The Cannons came in trying to improve upon their 8-6 record in 2016. Although they were one of seven teams tied upon the top of the standings with an 8-6 record, the Cannons were one of three teams not given a playoff berth following tiebreaker procedures.

On December 20, 2016, it was announced that John Tucker would be returning to the Cannons as the team's offensive coordinator in 2017. Tucker was fired mid-season by the expansion team Atlanta Blaze after a 3-7 start.

On June 27, the 3-6 Cannons traded away Will Manny and Joe LoCascio to the New York Lizards for Dave Lawson and Chris LaPierre. On July 14, the Cannons announced that neither Lawson nor LaPierre would suit up for the team that season. Dave Lawson informed team officials that he would be retiring from the league while Chris LaPierre decided not to report to the team. The Cannons did not win another game on the year, finishing a league and franchise-worst 3-11.

== Schedule ==
=== Regular season ===
Date	Opponent	Stadium	Result	Attendance	Record
April 22	at Florida Launch	Spec Martin Stadium (Deland, FL)	W 18-17 (OT)	1,827	1-0
April 29	at Atlanta Blaze	Fifth Third Bank Stadium	L 10-13	946	1-1
May 6	Chesapeake Bayhawks	Harvard Stadium	L 18-19	4,598	1-2
May 13	Rochester Rattlers	Harvard Stadium	L 10-13	4,273	1-3
May 20	New York Lizards	Harvard Stadium	W 16-13	6,299	2-3
June 3	Denver Outlaws	Harvard Stadium	L 13-19	4,846	2-4
June 10	at Ohio Machine	Fortress Obetz	L 12-13 (OT)	3,214	2-5
June 17	at Denver Outlaws	Sports Authority Field at Mile High	W 16-9	6,838	3-5
June 22	Ohio Machine	Harvard Stadium	L 15-16 (OT)	4,162	3-6
July 16	at Rochester Rattlers	Rochester Rhinos Stadium	L 9-21	1,065	3-7
July 20	at New York Lizards	James M. Shuart Stadium	L 14-16	5,719	3-8
July 27	at Charlotte Hounds	American Legion Memorial Stadium	L 12-16	1,775	3-9
July 29	Florida Launch	Harvard Stadium	L 17-18	5,579	3-10
August 5	Atlanta Blaze	Harvard Stadium	L 16-18	4,212	3-11

== Standings ==
2017 Major League Lacrosse Standings
	W	L	PCT	GB	GF	2ptGF	GA	2ptGA
Denver Outlaws	9	5	.643	-	199	5	174	6
Ohio Machine	9	5	.643	-	195	2	163	6
Florida Launch	8	6	.571	1	179	5	202	9
Rochester Rattlers	8	6	.571	1	182	2	171	3
New York Lizards	7	7	.500	2	183	7	198	4
Chesapeake Bayhawks	7	7	.500	2	211	9	206	1
Charlotte Hounds	6	8	.429	3	184	9	189	5
Atlanta Blaze	6	8	.429	3	182	6	189	8
Boston Cannons	3	11	.214	6	189	7	212	9

Playoff Seed
