= 2017 New York Lizards season =

2017 New York Lizards
- League: Major League Lacrosse
- 2017 record: 7–7
- General Manager: Joe Spallina
- Coach: Joe Spallina
- Arena: James M. Shuart Stadium
- Average attendance: 5,171

The 2017 New York Lizards season was the seventeenth season for the New York Lizards, a charter franchise of Major League Lacrosse. It is also their fifth season using the New York moniker. The team came in trying to improve upon their 8–6 record in 2016 that was good enough for a second seed in the postseason, but ultimately resulted in a 20–17 semifinal loss to the Denver Outlaws.

On February 16, 2017, face off specialist Greg Gurenlian announced that he would be retiring at the end of the season. On August 5, Gurenlian played in his last game. Despite a 17–14 win over the Charlotte Hounds, the Lizards finished 7–7 and missed out on the playoffs for the first time in four years. Gurenlian won 20 of his 33 faceoffs in his last game in front of the largest crowd of the season. He holds the career record of 2,024 faceoff wins.

At the trade deadline on June 27, the Lizards traded Dave Lawson and Chris LaPierre for the Boston Cannons' team captain Will Manny and Joe LoCascio. On July 14, the Cannons announced that neither Lawson nor LaPierre would suit up for the team that season. Dave Lawson informed team officials that he would be retiring from the league while Chris LaPierre decided not to report to the team. The Lizards said that they were not aware of the intentions of Lawson or LaPierre. There wasn't a no-report clause in the deal. The Cannons appealed to the league for compensation, but did not receive any.

== Schedule ==
=== Regular season ===
Date	Opponent	Stadium	Result	Attendance	Record
April 22	at Chesapeake Bayhawks	Navy–Marine Corps Memorial Stadium	W 15-14 (OT)	4,215	1-0
April 29	Denver Outlaws	James M. Shuart Stadium	L 7-13	4,598	1-1
May 13	at Atlanta Blaze	Fifth Third Bank Stadium	W 14-12	1,976	2-1
May 20	at Boston Cannons	Harvard Stadium	L 13-16	6,299	2-2
June 2	Florida Launch	James M. Shuart Stadium	L 10-13	4,195	2-3
June 10	at Florida Launch	FAU Stadium	L 14-15 (OT)	2,337	2-4
June 17	Rochester Rattlers	James M. Shuart Stadium	W 13-12	4,329	3-4
June 24	at Denver Outlaws	Sports Authority Field at Mile High	L 14-17	5,122	3-5
June 29	Ohio Machine	James M. Shuart Stadium	W 15-14	5,108	4-5
July 13	Atlanta Blaze	James M. Shuart Stadium	L 14-16	5,496	4-6
July 15	at Charlotte Hounds	American Legion Memorial Stadium	W 14-11	2,156	5-6
July 20	Boston Cannons	James M. Shuart Memorial Stadium	W 16-14	5,719	6-6
July 29	at Ohio Machine	Fortress Obetz	L 14-21	3,419	6-7
August 5	Charlotte Hounds	James M. Shuart Stadium	W 17-14	6,758	7-7

== Standings ==
2017 Major League Lacrosse Standings
	W	L	PCT	GB	GF	2ptGF	GA	2ptGA
Denver Outlaws	9	5	.643	-	199	5	174	6
Ohio Machine	9	5	.643	-	195	2	163	6
Florida Launch	8	6	.571	1	179	5	202	9
Rochester Rattlers	8	6	.571	1	182	2	171	3
New York Lizards	7	7	.500	2	183	7	198	4
Chesapeake Bayhawks	7	7	.500	2	211	9	206	1
Charlotte Hounds	6	8	.429	3	184	9	189	5
Atlanta Blaze	6	8	.429	3	182	6	189	8
Boston Cannons	3	11	.214	6	189	7	212	9

Playoff Seed
