= 2017 Ohio Machine season =

2017 Ohio Machine
- League: Major League Lacrosse
- 2017 record: 9-5
- General Manager: Bear Davis
- Coach: Bear Davis, Nat St. Laurent, Daryl Delia, Paul Collura
- Arena: Fortress Obetz
- Average attendance: 2,451

The 2017 Ohio Machine season was the sixth season for the Ohio Machine of Major League Lacrosse. The Machine entered trying to continue their success from 2016 when they finished with an 8-6 record, good enough for the top postseason seed following tiebreaker procedures. However, the top seed did not guarantee them a championship win, as they lost in the 2016 Steinfeld Cup 19-18 to the Denver Outlaws. After defeating the Florida Launch in the semifinal game on August 12, the Machine captured their first title in franchise history with a 17-12 victory over the same Denver Outlaws.

On November 17, 2016, the Machine announced they were moving into a brand new 6,500-seat stadium Fortress Obetz in time for their 2017 home opener. The new stadium would be in the village of Obetz on the former site of the Columbus Motor Speedway and become the third home venue in team history. The Machine lost their home opener at the new Fortress Obetz on May 6 to the Rochester Rattlers, 12-11 in overtime.

For the second straight season, the Machine clinched a playoff berth with a convincing win over the New York Lizards. The team also clinched a home playoff game on July 29 by defeating the Lizards, 21-14. The Machine lost the following week to finish 9-5 and take the second seed into the postseason.

== Schedule ==
=== Regular season ===
Date	Opponent	Stadium	Result	Attendance	Record
April 22	at Atlanta Blaze	Fifth Third Bank Stadium	W 10-9	1,204	1-0
April 29	at Charlotte Hounds	American Legion Memorial Stadium	W 15-12	1,073	2-0
May 6	Rochester Rattlers	Fortress Obetz	L 11-12 (OT)	1,468	2-1
May 20	Charlotte Hounds	Fortress Obetz	L 8-10	2,810	2-2
May 27	Florida Launch	Fortress Obetz	W 19-7	1,028	3-2
June 2	at Chesapeake Bayhawks	Navy–Marine Corps Memorial Stadium	W 18-11	4,048	4-2
June 10	Boston Cannons	Fortress Obetz	W 13-12 (OT)	3,214	5-2
June 22	at Boston Cannons	Harvard Stadium	W 16-15 (OT)	4,162	6-2
June 24	Chesapeake Bayhawks	Fortress Obetz	W 15-13	1,986	7-2
June 29	at New York Lizards	James M. Shuart Stadium	L 14-15	5,108	7-3
July 15	Denver Outlaws	Fortress Obetz	L 11-13	3,232	7-4
July 23	Denver Outlaws	Sports Authority Field at Mile High	W 13-12	7,016	8-4
July 29	New York Lizards	Fortress Obetz	W 21-14	3,419	9-4
August 5	at Rochester Rattlers	Rochester Rhinos Stadium	L 13-14	3,431	9-5

=== Postseason ===
Date	Round	Opponent	Stadium	Result	Attendance
August 12	Semifinal	Florida Launch	Fortress Obetz	W 18-13	2,282
August 19	Steinfeld Cup	Denver Outlaws	The Ford Center at The Star (Frisco, TX)	W 17-12	7,543

== Standings ==
2017 Major League Lacrosse Standings
	W	L	PCT	GB	GF	2ptGF	GA	2ptGA
Denver Outlaws	9	5	.643	-	199	5	174	6
Ohio Machine	9	5	.643	-	195	2	163	6
Florida Launch	8	6	.571	1	179	5	202	9
Rochester Rattlers	8	6	.571	1	182	2	171	3
New York Lizards	7	7	.500	2	183	7	198	4
Chesapeake Bayhawks	7	7	.500	2	211	9	206	1
Charlotte Hounds	6	8	.429	3	184	9	189	5
Atlanta Blaze	6	8	.429	3	182	6	189	8
Boston Cannons	3	11	.214	6	189	7	212	9

Playoff Seed
