= 2017 Denver Outlaws season =

Major League Lacrosse team's performance during the 2017 season

2017 Denver Outlaws
- League: Major League Lacrosse
- 2017 record: 9-5
- General Manager: Tony Seaman
- Coach: B.J. O'Hara
- Arena: Sports Authority Field at Mile High
- Average attendance: 9,212

The 2017 Denver Outlaws season was the twelfth season for the Denver Outlaws of Major League Lacrosse. The Outlaws come into the 2017 season as defending MLL champions after defeating the Ohio Machine in the 2016 final, 19-18. After losing in their first four Steinfeld Cup appearances, the Outlaws have won two championships in the past three seasons. Despite winning the title in 2016, the Outlaws had to rattle off six straight wins at the end of the regular season just to finish tied atop the standings at 8-6 with six other teams. Due to tiebreaker procedures, the Outlaws were rewarded the third seed in the postseason.

On August 5, thanks to an Ohio loss to Rochester in the last week of the regular season, the Outlaws clinched the top spot in the postseason with a 9-5 record. On August 19, the Outlaws played in their MLL-record seventh league championship game, but lost to the Machine 17-12.

== Schedule ==
=== Regular season ===
| Date | Opponent | Stadium | Result | Attendance | Record |
|---|---|---|---|---|---|
| April 22 | at Charlotte Hounds | American Legion Memorial Stadium | W 13-12 | 1,624 | 1-0 |
| April 29 | at New York Lizards | James M. Shuart Stadium | W 13-7 | 4,598 | 2-0 |
| May 7 | Charlotte Hounds | Sports Authority Field at Mile High | W 11-7 | 4,159 | 3-0 |
| May 13 | at Florida Launch | FAU Stadium | W 15-8 | 2,208 | 4-0 |
| May 27 | Rochester Rattlers | Sports Authority Field at Mile High | L 15-16 | 4,917 | 4-1 |
| June 3 | at Boston Cannons | Harvard Stadium | W 19-13 | 4,846 | 5-1 |
| June 17 | Boston Cannons | Sports Authority Field at Mile High | L 9-16 | 6,838 | 5-2 |
| June 24 | New York Lizards | Sports Authority Field at Mile High | W 17-14 | 5,122 | 6-2 |
| July 4 | Atlanta Blaze | Sports Authority Field at Mile High | W 24-12 | 26,614 | 7-2 |
| July 15 | at Ohio Machine | Fortress Obetz | W 13-11 | 3,232 | 8-2 |
| July 20 | at Rochester Rattlers | Rochester Rhinos Stadium | L 12-18 | 1,521 | 8-3 |
| July 23 | Ohio Machine | Sports Authority Field at Mile High | L 12-13 | 7,016 | 8-4 |
| July 27 | Chesapeake Bayhawks | Sports Authority Field at Mile High | W 12-11 (OT) | 9,824 | 9-4 |
| August 3 | at Chesapeake Bayhawks | Navy–Marine Corps Memorial Stadium | L 19-23 | 2,687 | 9-5 |

=== Postseason ===
| Date | Round | Opponent | Stadium | Result | Attendance |
|---|---|---|---|---|---|
| August 12 | Semifinal | Rochester Rattlers | Peter Barton Lacrosse Stadium | W 15-8 | 2,681 |
| August 19 | Steinfeld Cup | Ohio Machine | The Ford Center at The Star (Frisco, TX) | L 12-17 | 7,543 |

== Standings ==
2017 Major League Lacrosse Standings
| | W | L | PCT | GB | GF | 2ptGF | GA | 2ptGA |
|---|---|---|---|---|---|---|---|---|
| Denver Outlaws | 9 | 5 | .643 | - | 199 | 5 | 174 | 6 |
| Ohio Machine | 9 | 5 | .643 | - | 195 | 2 | 163 | 6 |
| Florida Launch | 8 | 6 | .571 | 1 | 179 | 5 | 202 | 9 |
| Rochester Rattlers | 8 | 6 | .571 | 1 | 182 | 2 | 171 | 3 |
| New York Lizards | 7 | 7 | .500 | 2 | 183 | 7 | 198 | 4 |
| Chesapeake Bayhawks | 7 | 7 | .500 | 2 | 211 | 9 | 206 | 1 |
| Charlotte Hounds | 6 | 8 | .429 | 3 | 184 | 9 | 189 | 5 |
| Atlanta Blaze | 6 | 8 | .429 | 3 | 182 | 6 | 189 | 8 |
| Boston Cannons | 3 | 11 | .214 | 6 | 189 | 7 | 212 | 9 |

Playoff Seed
