= 2017 Rochester Rattlers season =

2017 Rochester Rattlers
- League: Major League Lacrosse
- 2017 record: 8–6
- General Manager: Tim Soudan
- Coach: Tim Soudan
- Arena: Capelli Sport Stadium
- Average attendance: 2,191

The 2017 Rochester Rattlers season is the fifteenth season for the Rochester Rattlers of Major League Lacrosse. In 2016, the Rattlers were one of seven teams tied atop the standings at 8–6. However, after tiebreaker procedures, the Rattlers were one of three teams left out of the four-team postseason. Seeking revenge, the Rattlers won their last four games of the regular season, including victories over the defending champion Denver Outlaws and runners-up Ohio Machine, to clinch their third playoff spot in four years. At 8–6, the Rattlers earned the fourth seed. The Rattlers' season would come to an end on August 12 in Denver by way of a 15–8 loss to the Outlaws.

Amidst rumors that the team would be relocating to Dallas for the 2017 season, the team announced on January 19 that it would be moving back to Capelli Sport Stadium after playing one season at Aquinas Institute.

Despite drawing their best attendance since the 2012 season and making the playoffs, the team was relocated to the Dallas area and Ford Center at The Star in November 2017. The announcement was made at the Dallas Cowboys World Headquarters in Frisco, Texas.

== Schedule ==
=== Regular season ===
Date	Opponent	Stadium	Result	Attendance	Record
April 29	at Florida Launch	Spec Martin Stadium (Deland, FL)	L 10–12	1,764	0–1
May 6	at Ohio Machine	Fortress Obetz	W 12–11 (OT)	1,468	1–1
May 11	Charlotte Hounds	Capelli Sport Stadium	L 10–14	1,736	1–2
May 13	at Boston Cannons	Harvard Stadium	W 13–10	4,273	2–2
May 20	Florida Launch	Capelli Sport Stadium	L 8–9 (OT)	1,744	2–3
May 27	at Denver Outlaws	Sports Authority Field at Mile High	W 16–15	4,917	3–3
June 10	Chesapeake Bayhawks	Capelli Sport Stadium	W 17–16 (OT)	2,029	4–3
June 17	at New York Lizards	James M. Shuart Stadium	L 12–13	4,329	4–4
June 24	Atlanta Blaze	Capelli Sport Stadium	L 13–14 (OT)	3,817	4–5
July 2	at Chesapeake Bayhawks	Navy–Marine Corps Memorial Stadium	L 9–19	10,002	4–6
July 16	Boston Cannons	Capelli Sport Stadium	W 21–9	1,065	5–6
July 20	Denver Outlaws	Capelli Sport Stadium	W 18–12	1,521	6–6
July 29	at Atlanta Blaze	Fifth Third Bank Stadium	W 11–7	2,300	7–6
August 5	Ohio Machine	Capelli Sport Stadium	W 14–13	3,431	8–6

=== Postseason ===
Date	Round	Opponent	Stadium	Result	Attendance
August 12	Semifinal	Denver Outlaws	Peter Barton Lacrosse Stadium	L 8–15	2,681

== Standings ==
2017 Major League Lacrosse Standings
	W	L	PCT	GB	GF	2ptGF	GA	2ptGA
Denver Outlaws	9	5	.643	-	199	5	174	6
Ohio Machine	9	5	.643	-	195	2	163	6
Florida Launch	8	6	.571	1	179	5	202	9
Rochester Rattlers	8	6	.571	1	182	2	171	3
New York Lizards	7	7	.500	2	183	7	198	4
Chesapeake Bayhawks	7	7	.500	2	211	9	206	1
Charlotte Hounds	6	8	.429	3	184	9	189	5
Atlanta Blaze	6	8	.429	3	182	6	189	8
Boston Cannons	3	11	.214	6	189	7	212	9

Playoff Seed
