= 2017 Atlanta Blaze season =

2017 Atlanta Blaze
- League: Major League Lacrosse
- 2017 record: 6-8 (8th of 9)
- Home record: 3-4
- Road record: 3-4
- Goals for: 188
- Goals against: 197
- General Manager: Spencer Ford
- Coach: Dave Huntley
- Stadium: Fifth Third Bank Stadium
- Average attendance: 2,037

Team leaders
- Goals: Kevin Rice (27)
- Assists: Kevin Rice (20)
- Points: Kevin Rice (47)
- Penalties in minutes: Callum Robinson (9.5)
- Loose Balls: Scott Ratliff (68)
- Wins: Adam Ghitelman (6)
- Goals against average: Adam Ghitelman (12.69)

The 2017 Atlanta Blaze season was the second season for the Atlanta Blaze of Major League Lacrosse and David Huntley's first full season as head coach after taking over for John Tucker ten games into 2016. The Blaze posted two more wins in 2017, finishing their second season at 6-8 and eighth place in the standings.

On December 29, 2016, former Atlanta Hawks and Thrashers executive Jim Pfeifer was named the team's new president. In April 2017, the team’s owner Peter Trematerra sued the MLL for misinterpretations from when he bought the league in 2014.

== Schedule ==
=== Regular season ===
Date	Opponent	Stadium	Result	Attendance	Record
April 22	Ohio Machine	Fifth Third Bank Stadium	L 9-10	1,204	0-1
April 29	Boston Cannons	Fifth Third Bank Stadium	W 13-10	946	1-1
May 13	New York Lizards	Fifth Third Bank Stadium	L 12-14	1,976	1-2
May 19	at Chesapeake Bayhawks	Navy–Marine Corps Memorial Stadium	L 11-13	3,600	1-3
June 3	Charlotte Hounds	Fifth Third Bank Stadium	W 19-18	2,811	2-3
June 10	at Charlotte Hounds	American Legion Memorial Stadium	L 12-18	1,096	2-4
June 17	at Florida Launch	FAU Stadium	L 16-19	3,728	2-5
June 24	at Rochester Rattlers	Capelli Sport Stadium	W 14-13 (OT)	3,817	3-5
July 1	Florida Launch	Fifth Third Bank Stadium	W 17-4	2,288	4-5
July 4	at Denver Outlaws	Sports Authority Field at Mile High	L 12-24	26,614	4-6
July 13	at New York Lizards	James M. Shuart Stadium	W 16-14	5,496	5-6
July 22	Chesapeake Bayhawks	Fifth Third Bank Stadium	L 12-13	2,014	5-7
July 29	Rochester Rattlers	Fifth Third Bank Stadium	L 7-11	2,300	5-8
August 5	at Boston Cannons	Harvard Stadium	W 18-16	4,212	6-8

== Standings ==
2017 Major League Lacrosse Standings
	W	L	PCT	GB	GF	2ptGF	GA	2ptGA
Denver Outlaws	9	5	.643	-	199	5	174	6
Ohio Machine	9	5	.643	-	195	2	163	6
Florida Launch	8	6	.571	1	179	5	202	9
Rochester Rattlers	8	6	.571	1	182	2	171	3
New York Lizards	7	7	.500	2	183	7	198	4
Chesapeake Bayhawks	7	7	.500	2	211	9	206	1
Charlotte Hounds	6	8	.429	3	184	9	189	5
Atlanta Blaze	6	8	.429	3	182	6	189	8
Boston Cannons	3	11	.214	6	189	7	212	9

Playoff Seed
