= 2017 Chesapeake Bayhawks season =

Major League Lacrosse season

2017 Chesapeake Bayhawks
- League: Major League Lacrosse
- Rank: 6th
- 2017 record: 7–7
- Home record: 4–3
- Road record: 3–4
- Goals for: 211
- Goals against: 206
- General Manager: Dave Cottle
- Coach: Brian Reese
- Stadium: Navy–Marine Corps Memorial Stadium
- Average attendance: 4,798

Team leaders
- Goals: Josh Byrne (39)
- Assists: Myles Jones (14)
- Points: Josh Byrne (46)
- Penalties in minutes: Michael Evans (5.5)
- Ground Balls: Jesse Bernhardt (60)
- Wins: Niko Amato (5)
- Goals against average: Niko Amato (13.73)

The 2017 Chesapeake Bayhawks season was the seventeenth season of the Chesapeake Bayhawks in Major League Lacrosse, and eighth season using the Chesapeake moniker. This season the team added some key young players including Lyle Thompson, Josh Byrne, Isaiah Davis-Allen, Jake Froccaro, and Ben Williams. The Bayhawks, in a three-year playoff drought, entered the season trying to improve upon their 8–6 record in 2016. Despite being one of the seven teams tied atop the 2016 standings with an 8–6 record, the Bayhawks did not make the postseason due to tiebreaker procedures.

The defending champion Denver Outlaws beat the visiting Bayhawks 12–11 in overtime in the next-to-last game of the season. This third overtime defeat of the season knocked Chesapeake out of the playoffs. However, they managed to finish 7–7 by bouncing back in the final game to defeat the Outlaws at home 23–19. Josh Byrne scored seven goals and set a league record for goals in a season by a rookie with 39. Byrne's 39 goals – in only 9 games – also led the entire league in 2017.

== Schedule ==
=== Regular season ===
Date	Opponent	Stadium	Result	Attendance	Record
April 22	New York Lizards	Navy–Marine Corps Memorial Stadium	L 14–15 (OT)	4,215	0–1
May 6	at Boston Cannons	Harvard Stadium	W 19–18	4,598	1–1
May 13	at Charlotte Hounds	American Legion Memorial Stadium	W 17–16	1,693	2–1
May 19	Atlanta Blaze	Homewood Field (Baltimore, MD)	W 13–11	3,600	3–1
June 2	Ohio Machine	Navy–Marine Corps Memorial Stadium	L 11–18	4,048	3–2
June 10	at Rochester Rattlers	Rochester Rhinos Stadium	L 16–17 (OT)	2,029	3–3
June 16	Charlotte Hounds	Navy–Marine Corps Memorial Stadium	L 14–15	4,615	3–4
June 24	at Ohio Machine	Fortress Obetz	L 13–15	1,986	3–5
July 2	Rochester Rattlers	Navy–Marine Corps Memorial Stadium	W 19–9	10,002	4–5
July 15	at Florida Launch	FAU Stadium	L 19–20	1,200	4–6
July 20	Florida Launch	Navy–Marine Corps Memorial Stadium	W 18–10	4,420	5–6
July 22	at Atlanta Blaze	Fifth Third Bank Stadium	W 13–12	2,014	6–6
July 27	at Denver Outlaws	Sports Authority Field at Mile High	L 11–12 (OT)	9,824	6–7
August 3	Denver Outlaws	Navy–Marine Corps Memorial Stadium	W 23–19	2,687	7–7

== Standings ==
2017 Major League Lacrosse Standings
	W	L	PCT	GB	GF	2ptGF	GA	2ptGA
Denver Outlaws	9	5	.643	-	199	5	174	6
Ohio Machine	9	5	.643	-	195	2	163	6
Florida Launch	8	6	.571	1	179	5	202	9
Rochester Rattlers	8	6	.571	1	182	2	171	3
New York Lizards	7	7	.500	2	183	7	198	4
Chesapeake Bayhawks	7	7	.500	2	211	9	206	1
Charlotte Hounds	6	8	.429	3	184	9	189	5
Atlanta Blaze	6	8	.429	3	182	6	189	8
Boston Cannons	3	11	.214	6	189	7	212	9

Playoff Seed

== Roster ==
2017 Chesapeake Bayhawks
#	Player's Name	Nationality	Position	Height	Weight	College
0	John Maloney	(United States)	M	6 ft 2 in	185 lb	Albany
3	Matt Abbott	(United States)	M	6 ft 2 in	185 lb	Syracuse
4	Lyle Thompson	(Haudenosaunee)	A	6 ft 0 in	180 lb	Albany
5	Colin Heacock	(United States)	A	6 ft 3 in	210 lb	Maryland
6	Nathan Lewnes	(United States)	A	5 ft 9 in	180 lb	UMBC
7	Nick Manis	(United States)	M	6 ft 0 in	190 lb	Maryland
9	C.J. Costabile	(United States)	D	6 ft 1 in	197 lb	Duke
12	Ryan Tucker	(United States)	M	6 ft 2 in	200 lb	Virginia
13	Niko Amato	(United States)	G	5 ft 8 in	185 lb	Maryland
15	Myles Jones	(United States)	M	6 ft 5 in	235 lb	Duke
16	Mark Glicini	(United States)	M	6 ft 1 in	195 lb	Yale
18	Domenic Sebastiani	(United States)	M	6 ft 0 in	190 lb	Delaware
24	Stephen Kelly	(United States)	M/FO	5 ft 10 in	180 lb	North Carolina
26	Isaiah Davis-Allen	(United States)	M	6 ft 2 in	180 lb	Maryland
27	Brian Farrell	(United States)	D	6 ft 5 in	240 lb	Maryland
28	Will Koshansky	(United States)	D	6 ft 2 in	195 lb	Penn
30	Brian Phipps	(United States)	G	5 ft 9 in	190 lb	Maryland
32	Pat Frazier	(United States)	D	6 ft 1 in	190 lb	Loyola
33	Michael Evans	(United States)	D	6 ft 0 in	220 lb	Johns Hopkins
36	Jesse Bernhardt	(United States)	D	6 ft 0 in	200 lb	Maryland
37	Ben Williams	(United States)	M/FO	5 ft 11 in	192 lb	Syracuse
40	Matt Danowski	(United States)	A	6 ft 0 in	200 lb	Duke
42	Josh Byrne	(United States)	A	6 ft 3 in	200 lb	Hofstra
54	Jake Froccaro	(United States)	M	6 ft 1 in	195 lb	Nova
66	Nick Aponte	(United States)	A	6 ft 1 in	195 lb	Penn State
77	Charlie Raffa	(United States)	M	6 ft 1 in	195 lb	Maryland
