= 2017 Major League Lacrosse season =

2017 MLL season
- League: Major League Lacrosse
- Sport: Field lacrosse
- Duration: April 22 – August 19, 2017
- Teams: 9
- Season MVP: Tom Schreiber (Ohio Machine)
- Top scorer: Eric Law (Denver Outlaws) and Peter Baum (Ohio Machine)

Steinfeld Cup
- Champions: Ohio Machine
- Runners-up: Denver Outlaws
- Finals MVP: Marcus Holman (Outlaws)

MLL seasons
- ← 2016 season 2018 season →

The 2017 Major League Lacrosse season was the 17th season of Major League Lacrosse. Featuring the same nine teams as 2016, the season began on April 22. All four games played on opening weekend were won by the road team and decided by one goal, two in overtime. The season culminated in the championship game on August 19 in Frisco, Texas at The Ford Center at The Star. In a rematch of the 2016 championship game, the Ohio Machine defeated the Denver Outlaws 17–12, capturing their first Steinfeld Cup in franchise history.

The 2017 season was the last one headed by commissioner David Gross. It was announced on December 23, 2016 that the league's commissioner since 2004 would be stepping down after the season.

== Milestones and events ==
- November 15, 2016 - The 2017 MLL schedule is announced. Notable games include a 2016 Steinfeld Cup rematch on July 15 in Denver between the Outlaws and the Machine. The Blaze will be the Outlaws' opponent in their annual Independence Day game for the first time on Tuesday, July 4.
- November 16 - The village of Obetz announces the construction of a new 6,500-seat multi-purpose stadium, Fortress Obetz at the site of the closed Columbus Motor Speedway. The stadium will be finished in time for the Machine's first home game on May 6. It will be the third venue in franchise history.
- December 7 - The league announces that the 2017 MLL All Star Game will be played at the 11,500-seat Bonney Field in Sacramento. It is the second straight year that the event will be held in California.
- December 23 - Commissioner David Gross announces he will be stepping down after the 2017 season. Gross became the league's first commissioner in 2004.
- January 19, 2017 - The Rattlers announce that they will return to Rochester Rhinos Stadium after one season at Wegman's Stadium at the Aquinas Institute, which only sat 2,000. The Rattlers played at Rhinos Stadium between 2006 and 2015.
- February 15 - The league announces that the 2017 MLL Championship Game will be held at The Ford Center at The Star, in Frisco, Texas. It will be the first championship game held in the state of Texas and only second championship game held west of the Mississippi River, as well as only the second Major League Lacrosse event held in Texas.
- April 19 - John Grant Jr. announces his retirement after 13 seasons in the league. He is the league's all-time leader in goals scored in a career and a game (10). The same day, it was announced he would be joining his former team the Denver Outlaws as an assistant.
- April 25 - Attackman Brendan Mundorf announces his retirement from the league after ten seasons with the Outlaws and Bayhawks. He retires with 291 career goals, second-most in MLL history.
- April 28 - The league announces a partnership with Twitter, who will stream 15 regular season games in the 2017 season, and the two semifinal games. Twitter also partnered up with the National Lacrosse League in 2017.
- May 28 - The collegiate draft took place in Foxborough, Massachuttes, on NCAA Championship Weekend. 2016 Tewaaraton Award winner Dylan Molloy, an attackman from Brown University, was selected by the Florida Launch with the first overall pick. Florida drafted Nick Mariano and Sergio Salcido, both from Syracuse, with its two other first round picks.
- June 27 - The 3–6 Cannons traded away team captain Will Manny and Joe LoCascio to the New York Lizards for Dave Lawson and Chris LaPierre. On July 14, the Cannons announced that neither Lawson nor LaPierre would suit up for the team that season. Dave Lawson informed team officials that he would be retiring from the league while Chris LaPierre decided not to report to the team.
- July 8 - The All Star Game took place at Papa Murphy's Park in Sacramento. Myles Jones won the game for Team Stripes in overtime, 21-20 over Team Stars, in front of 7,761 fans.

=== Coaching changes ===
- Florida Launch - Tom Mariano, former assistant for the Bayhawks, was announced as the second coach in franchise history on December 7. This is after Stan Ross resigned on November 17 following a 13–29 combined record in his first three seasons.

== Teams ==
Atlanta Blaze	Boston Cannons	Charlotte Hounds	Chesapeake Bayhawks
Fifth Third Bank Stadium	Harvard Stadium	American Legion Memorial Stadium	Navy–Marine Corps Memorial Stadium
Capacity: 8,318	Capacity: 30,323	Capacity: 21,000	Capacity: 34,000

Locations of teams for the 2017 MLL season

Denver Outlaws	Florida Launch	New York Lizards	Ohio Machine	Rochester Rattlers
Sports Authority Field at Mile High	FAU Stadium	James M. Shuart Stadium	Fortress Obetz	Rochester Rhinos Stadium
Capacity: 76,125	Capacity: 29,419	Capacity: 11,929	Capacity: 6,500	Capacity: 13,768

== Standings ==
2017 Major League Lacrosse Standings
	W	L	PCT	GB	GF	2ptGF	GA	2ptGA
Denver Outlaws	9	5	.643	-	199	5	174	6
Ohio Machine	9	5	.643	-	195	2	163	6
Florida Launch	8	6	.571	1	179	5	202	9
Rochester Rattlers	8	6	.571	1	182	2	171	3
New York Lizards	7	7	.500	2	183	7	198	4
Chesapeake Bayhawks	7	7	.500	2	211	9	206	1
Charlotte Hounds	6	8	.429	3	184	9	189	5
Atlanta Blaze	6	8	.429	3	182	6	189	8
Boston Cannons	3	11	.214	6	189	7	212	9

Playoff Seed

== Attendance ==
League attendance reached a record low in 2017, driven by one-third and one-fourth drops for Boston and Chesapeake, respectively. However, for the first time since the 2013 season, only one team, Charlotte, finished with an average of under 2,000 a game.

Team	Total	Average	Change
Denver	64,490	9,212	-2%
New York	36,203	5,171	-2%
Boston	33,969	4,852	-32%
Chesapeake	33,587	4,798	-24%
Ohio	17,157	2,451	29%
Florida	16,086	2,298	36%
Rochester	15,343	2,191	51%
Atlanta	14,259	2,037	-39%
Charlotte	11,105	1,586	-21%
League	242,199	3,844	-10%

== Playoffs ==
On February 15, the league announced the Steinfeld Cup would be held at The Ford Center at The Star in Frisco, Texas. After being held at neutral locations in 2016, the two semifinal games were held at the home stadiums of the two top-seeded teams, Denver and Ohio. Both teams cruised to home playoff wins over Rochester and Florida, respectively.

On August 19, the Outlaws and Machine played a rematch of the 2016 championship. This time, however, the Machine were victorious. Ohio came back from a four-goal third quarter deficit to win 17-12. Ohio scored the last seven goals of the game; Marcus Holman had three straight within four minutes in the fourth quarter and 6 points overall to earn the MVP award. 7,543 fans attended the game.

Semifinals; August 12
1	Denver	15
4	Rochester	8
2	Ohio	18
3	Florida	13

Championship; August 19
1	Denver	12
2	Ohio	17

== Season Awards ==
Award	Winner	Team
Most Valuable Player	Tom Schreiber	Ohio Machine
Rookie of the Year	Josh Byrne	Chesapeake Bayhawks
Offensive Player of the Year	Eric Law	Denver Outlaws
Defensive Player of the Year	Tucker Durkin	Florida Launch
Coach of the Year	Tom Mariano	Florida Launch
Goalie of the Year	Jack Kelly	Denver Outlaws
Most Improved Player	Kyle Bernlohr	Ohio Machine

=== All-MLL Team ===
Goalie	Team
Jack Kelly	Denver Outlaws
Defense	Team
Tucker Durkin	Florida Launch
Brian Karalunas	Ohio Machine
Joel White	Rochester Rattlers
Matt McMahon	Ohio Machine
Midfield	Team
Paul Rabil	New York Lizards
Tom Schreiber	Ohio Machine
Peter Baum	Ohio Machine
Attack	Team
Jordan Wolf	Rochester Rattlers
Eric Law	Denver Outlaws
Marcus Holman	Ohio Machine
