= Julian Nunamaker =

American football player (1946–1995)

No. 61, 88
- Positions: Defensive end, Defensive tackle

Personal information
- Born: February 13, 1946; Manning, South Carolina, U.S.
- Died: February 25, 1995 (aged 49); Jackson, Tennessee, U.S.
- Listed height: 6 ft 3 in (1.91 m)
- Listed weight: 252 lb (114 kg)

Career information
- High school: Manning (SC)
- College: UT Martin (1965-1968)
- NFL draft: 1969: 3rd round, 53rd overall pick

Career history
- Buffalo Bills (1969-1970); Long Island Chiefs (1973); New York Crusaders (1973)

Career NFL/AFL statistics
- Fumble recoveries: 3
- Stats at Pro Football Reference

Julian Nunamaker (February 13, 1946 – February 25, 1995) was an American professional football defensive end and defensive tackle. He played for the Buffalo Bills from 1969 to 1971. On February 18, 1995, he was involved in a car accident, dying a week later from his injuries.
