= New York Cosmos =

New York Cosmos may refer to:

- New York Cosmos (1971–1985), a defunct North American Soccer League (1968–1984) club
- New York Cosmos (2013–2020), a defunct North American Soccer League (2011–2017) and National Independent Soccer Association club
  - New York Cosmos B, their reserve team
  - New York Cosmos Stadium, their proposed, but never built stadium
- New York Cosmos (2026), a USL League One club
