= 2020–21 New York Cosmos season =

1st season of the National Independent Soccer Association

New York Cosmos
2020–21 season season
- Owner: New York Cosmos LLC
- Chairman: Rocco B. Commisso
- Head coach: Carlos Mendes
- Stadium: Mitchel Athletic Complex; Uniondale, New York
- NISA: Fall, Eastern: 3rd Spring: N/A
- Playoffs: Fall: Group stage Spring: N/A
- U.S. Open Cup: Did not enter
- Top goalscorer: League: Bljedi Bardic: 2 All: Bljedi Bardic: 2
- Biggest win: NAFC 1–3 NYC (Aug. 21)
- Biggest defeat: CAL 2–0 NYC (Sep. 22, Fall Playoffs)
Home colors	Away colors

The 2020–21 New York Cosmos season was the new Cosmos' sixth season of professional play and first playing in the National Independent Soccer Association. Including the previous franchise, it was the 20th season of a club entitled New York Cosmos playing professional soccer in the New York metropolitan area.

New York finished 3rd in the Eastern Conference during the NISA Fall Season before failing to advance out of the group stage of the Fall Championship. Prior to the Spring Season, the team announced it would be going on hiatus. A new iteration of the Cosmos began play in 2026.

== Background ==
In the Cosmos final season in the North American Soccer League, the team earned a 10–15–7 combined regular season record and qualified for the playoffs as a fourth seed. In the Soccer Bowl playoffs, the Cosmos defeated Spring and Fall regular season champion Miami FC in the semifinals via penalty kick shootout. On November 12, 2017, the team lost to the San Francisco Deltas, 2–0, in Soccer Bowl 2017.

Following the NASL's failure to obtain USSF Division II sanctioning and the subsequent cancelation of the 2018 season, the Cosmos organization moved players and staff to the New York Cosmos B. This reserve team had already been playing within the semi-professional National Premier Soccer League, which was governed by the United States Adult Soccer Association, and had won its national title during its inaugural season in 2015. For the next two seasons using a mix of first team and reserve players, Cosmos B, playing games at both Mitchel Athletic Complex and Rocco B. Commisso Soccer Stadium, finished the regular season first in the North Atlantic Conference and won the conference playoff championship both times. In 2019, the team qualified for the NPSL National Championship but fell to fellow NASL cast-off Miami FC, 3–1, at Mitchell. The team also qualified for both the 2018 and 2019 U.S. Open Cup tournaments, the former being through special permission, and reached the Play-In and Second Rounds in each respectively.

In 2019, the team attempted to rejoin the professional ranks within the NPSL's proposed professional league along with ten other teams. However, this never came to be and the originally titled "Founder's Cup," set to be a precursor tournament to the league, was renamed to the NPSL Members Cup with the Cosmos first team taking part along with five others including Chattanooga FC and Detroit City FC. The Cosmos finished second in the competition behind Detroit City. In June of that year, team owner Rocco B. Commisso completed the purchase of Serie A side ACF Fiorentina. On November 21, 2019, the Cosmos were announced as the newest member of the National Independent Soccer Association with plans to begin to play the following year.

In addition, the team also hosted 2. Bundesliga side FC St. Pauli on May 23, beating the German side, 2–1, at Columbia University.

== Club ==
=== Roster ===
As of March 16, 2021

Note: Flags indicate national team as defined under FIFA eligibility rules; some limited exceptions apply. Players may hold more than one non-FIFA nationality.

No.	Pos.	Nation	Player
2	DF	USA	Armando Guarnera
3	DF	USA	Pedro Galvão
5	DF	USA	Matt Lewis
6	DF	USA	CJ Weinstein
8	FW	CPV	Geo Alves
11	FW	USA	Aly Hassan
12	GK	HAI	Steward Ceus
13	DF	ALB	Ansi Agolli
15	FW	GRN	Shavon John-Brown
16	FW	MEX	Isaac Acuña
17	MF	USA	Salvatore Barone
20	FW	HON	Darwin Espinal
21	MF	USA	John Denis
22	GK	USA	Gianfranco Barone
23	DF	USA	Dominick Falanga
24	MF	ITA	Mattia Cella
25	MF	USA	Giuseppe Barone
26	MF	ENG	Charlie Ledula
27	DF	USA	Andrew Lubahn
28	MF	COL	Vincenzo Candela
31	GK	USA	Kevin Tenjo
32	DF	POL	Konrad Plewa

=== Coaching staff ===
Name	Position
(United States) Carlos Mendes	Head coach and general manager
(United States) Janine Guarriello	Team administrator

== Transfers ==
=== In ===
No.	Pos.	Player	Transferred from	Fee/notes	Date	Source
14	MF	(United States) Danny Szetela	(United States) New York Cosmos B	Team captain	February 3, 2020	
4	DF	(Italy) Emanuele Sembroni	(United States) New York Cosmos B		February 11, 2020	
20	FW	(Honduras) Darwin Espinal	(United States) New York Cosmos B	Loaned out for 2020 NISA Spring Season, all loans terminated on March 24, 2020	February 18, 2020	
5	DF	(United States) Matt Lewis	(United States) New York Cosmos B	Loaned out for 2020 NISA Spring Season, all loans terminated on March 24, 2020	February 20, 2020	
17	MF	(United States) Salvatore Barone	(United States) New York Cosmos B	Loaned out for 2020 NISA Spring Season, all loans terminated on March 24, 2020	February 20, 2020	
16	FW	(Mexico) Isaac Acuña	(United States) New York Cosmos B	Loaned out for 2020 NISA Spring Season, all loans terminated on March 24, 2020	February 28, 2020	
32	DF	(Poland) Konrad Plewa	(United States) Real Monarchs		March 10, 2020	
24	GK	(United States) Santiago Castaño	(United States) New York Cosmos B		May 29, 2020	
1	GK	(United States) Jesse Corke	(United States) New York Cosmos B		May 29, 2020	
3	DF	(United States) Pedro Galvão	(United States) New York Cosmos B		May 29, 2020	
13	DF	(Albania) Ansi Agolli	(United States) New York Cosmos B		May 29, 2020	
15	FW	(Grenada) Shavon John-Brown	(United States) New York Cosmos B		May 29, 2020	
28	MF	(Colombia) Vincenzo Candela	(United States) Charleston Battery		June 8, 2020	
7	FW	(Montenegro) Bljedi Bardic	(United States) New York Cosmos B		June 26, 2020	
11	FW	(United States) Aly Hassan	(United States) New York Cosmos B		July 2, 2020	
26	MF	(England) Charlie Ledula	(United States) New York Cosmos B		July 2, 2020	
8	FW	(Cape Verde) Geo Alves	(United States) Brockton FC United		July 10, 2020	
23	DF	(United States) Dominick Falanga	(United States) New York Cosmos B		July 10, 2020	
21	FW	(United States) John Devis	(United States) Columbia University		July 16, 2020	
6	MF	(United States) CJ Weinstein	(United States) Sacred Heart University		July 16, 2020	
25	FW	(United States) Giuseppe Barone	(United States) Milwaukee Torrent		July 23, 2020	
24	MF	(Italy) Mattia Cella	(United States) Caldwell University		July 23, 2020	
12	GK	(Haiti) Steward Ceus	(United States) Colorado Springs Switchbacks FC		July 24, 2020	
31	GK	(United States) Kevin Tenjo	(United States) Milwaukee Torrent		July 24, 2020	
27	DF	(United States) Andrew Lubahn	(United States) Loudoun United FC		July 27, 2020	
2	DF	(United States) Armando Guarnera	(United States) New York Cosmos B		August 11, 2020	
22	GK	(United States) Gianfranco Barone	(United States) Milwaukee Torrent		August 11, 2020	

=== Out ===
No.	Pos.	Player	Transferred to	Fee/notes	Date	Source
24	GK	(United States) Santiago Castaño	Unattached	Contract terminated	July 24, 2020	
4	DF	(Italy) Emanuele Sembroni	Unattached	Contract terminated	August 24, 2020	
7	FW	(Montenegro) Bljedi Bardic	(United States) New Amsterdam FC	Free transfer	January 15, 2021	
1	GK	(United States) Jesse Corke	(United States) New Amsterdam FC	Free transfer	March 2, 2021	
14	MF	(United States) Danny Szetela	(United States) Morris Elite SC	Free transfer	March 16, 2021	

=== Loan out ===
No.	Pos.	Player	Loaned to	Fee/notes	Date	Source
20	FW	(Honduras) Darwin Espinal	(United States) Oakland Roots SC	For 2020 NISA Spring Season, loan terminated on March 5, 2020	February 18, 2020	
5	DF	(United States) Matt Lewis	(United States) Detroit City FC	For 2020 NISA Spring Season, loans terminated on March 24, 2020	February 20, 2020	
17	MF	(United States) Salvatore Barone	(United States) Detroit City FC	For 2020 NISA Spring Season, loans terminated on March 24, 2020	February 20, 2020	
16	FW	(Mexico) Isaac Acuña	(United States) Detroit City FC	For 2020 NISA Spring Season, loans terminated on March 24, 2020	February 28, 2020	
20	FW	(Honduras) Darwin Espinal	(United States) Detroit City FC	For 2020 NISA Spring Season, loans terminated on March 24, 2020	March 11, 2020	

== Competitions ==
=== NISA Independent Cup ===
The Cosmos were announced as one of the four NISA teams taking part in the inaugural NISA Independent Cup on July 1. The regional tournament is set to act as both a pre-season and chance to "provide a platform for professional and amateur independent clubs to play together on a national stage."

New York was drawn into the Mid-Atlantic Region alongside fellow NISA expansion side New Amsterdam FC, Fall 2019 UPSL champion Maryland Bobcats FC, and NPSL side FC Baltimore Christos.

On July 24, NISA announced that the Mid-Atlantic Region tournament was postponed due to a surge of COVID-19 cases in Maryland and the subsequent closing of the Maryland SoccerPlex to professional sports. On July 28, NISA announced a majority of the region's games would be played at Evergreen Sportsplex in Leesburg, Virginia with the sole exception being the Cosmos opening match against New Amsterdam on August 2, which was played at Hudson Sports Complex in Warwick, New York.

==== Standings ====
Pos	Team	Pld	W	D	L	GF	GA	GD	Pts
1	Maryland Bobcats FC (C)	3	1	2	0	9	3	+6	5
2	FC Baltimore Christos	3	1	2	0	6	3	+3	5
3	New York Cosmos	3	0	3	0	4	4	0	3
4	New Amsterdam FC	3	0	1	2	2	11	−9	1

Source: nisaofficial.com
Rules for classification: 1) points; 2) head to head; 3) goal differential.
(C) Champions

==== Matches ====
August 2, 2020 Match 1	New York Cosmos	1–1	New Amsterdam FC	Warwick, New York
6:45 p.m.	Agolli 27', (yellow card) 45+5'; Cella (yellow card) 44'; Falanga (yellow card) 61'	Report; Broadcast	Afif (yellow card) 25'; Vicente (yellow card) 58'; Esche (yellow card) 73'; Bello 90+1', (yellow card) 90+1'	Stadium: Hudson Sports Complex; Attendance: 0
Note: Game was played behind closed doors due to the COVID-19 pandemic

August 6, 2020 Match 2	New York Cosmos	P–P	FC Baltimore Christos	Leesburg, Virginia
8:45 p.m.				Stadium: Evergreen Sportsplex
Note: Postponed due to weather

August 9, 2020 Match 3	Maryland Bobcats FC	1–1	New York Cosmos	Leesburg, Virginia
7:45 p.m.	Cauker (red card) 9'; Iosausu (yellow card) 61'; Forka 76'	Report; Broadcast	Acuña 19'; Candela (yellow card) 45'; Agolli (yellow card) 62'; Tenjo (yellow card) 71'	Stadium: Evergreen Sportsplex; Attendance: 0
Note: Game was played behind closed doors due to the COVID-19 pandemic

October 10, 2020 Match 2 (replay)	New York Cosmos	2–2	FC Baltimore Christos	Uniondale, New York
3:00 p.m.	Prentice (yellow card) 11'; Acuña 41'; Espinal 66'; Cella (yellow card) 90+1'; Galvão (red card) 90+5'	Report; Broadcast	Bender 12'; Dengler (yellow card) 44'; Granados (yellow card) 53'; Merriam 81' (pen.); Balogun (red card) 90+6'	Stadium: Mitchel Athletic Complex; Attendance: 0 Referee: Ernie Constantine
Note: Game was played behind closed doors due to the COVID-19 pandemic

=== NISA Fall Season ===
On June 4, NISA announced that details for the 2020 Fall Season. The nine member teams would be split into conferences, Eastern and Western, with the Cosmos playing in the former. The team is set to play eight regular season games against the rest of the eastern teams.

Details for the Fall regular season were announced on July 31, 2020. The Cosmos will take part as a member of the Eastern Conference.

==== Standings ====
Pos	Team	Pld	W	D	L	GF	GA	GD	Pts
1	Chattanooga FC	4	3	0	1	8	3	+5	9
2	Michigan Stars FC	4	2	2	0	6	2	+4	8
3	New York Cosmos	4	1	2	1	5	4	+1	5
4	Detroit City FC	4	1	2	1	3	2	+1	5
5	New Amsterdam FC	4	0	0	4	1	12	−11	0

Source: NISAofficial.com

==== Results summary ====
Overall								Home						Away					
Pld	W	D	L	GF	GA	GD	Pts	W	D	L	GF	GA	GD	W	D	L	GF	GA	GD
4	1	2	1	5	4	+1	5	0	2	0	1	1	0	1	0	1	4	3	+1

Last updated: September 12, 2020.
Source: Match reports

==== Matches ====
August 15, 2020 Week 1	New York Cosmos	1–1	Michigan Stars FC	Uniondale, New York
7:00 p.m. EDT	Szetela (yellow card) 53'; Bardic 72'	NISA Report; Cosmos Report; Broadcast	Bernedo (yellow card) 45'; Reynolds 90+2'	Stadium: Mitchel Athletic Complex; Attendance: 0
Note: Game was played behind closed doors due to the COVID-19 pandemic

August 21, 2020 Week 2	New Amsterdam FC	1–3	New York Cosmos	Warwick, New York
6:00 p.m. EDT	Vicente 15' (pen.); Nastu (yellow card) 32'; Esche (yellow card) 41'; Nadaner (yellow card) 82'	NISA Report; Cosmos Report; Broadcast	Agolli (yellow card) 30'; Lewis 45+1'; Bardic 47'; Sembroni (red card) 56'; Hassan (yellow card) 80' (goal) 87'; Szetela (yellow card) 90+3'	Stadium: Hudson Sports Complex; Attendance: 0
Note: Game was played behind closed doors due to the COVID-19 pandemic

August 29, 2020 Week 3	New York Cosmos	P–P	Detroit City FC	Uniondale, New York
7:00 p.m. EDT				Stadium: Mitchel Athletic Complex
Note: Match was postponed to protest racial injustice after the Shooting of Jacob Blake.

September 9, 2020 Week 3 (Replay)	New York Cosmos	0–0	Detroit City FC	Uniondale, New York
7:00 p.m. EDT	Cella (yellow card) 21'; Szetela (yellow card) 30'; Bardic (yellow card) 52'; Agolli (yellow card) 68'	NISA Report; FotMob Report; Broadcast	Matthews (yellow card) 15'; Conteh (yellow card) 35'	Stadium: Mitchel Athletic Complex; Attendance: 0 Referee: Christian Centeno
Note: Match make-up due to the Shooting of Jacob Blake. Game was played behind closed doors due to the COVID-19 pandemic.

September 12, 2020 Week 4	Chattanooga FC	2–1	New York Cosmos	Chattanooga, Tennessee
8:40 p.m. EDT	Koloko (yellow card) 62'; Lom 76' (pen.); Adams 81'; Russell (yellow card) 90+1'	NISA Report; FotMob Report; Broadcast	Ledula (yellow card) 34'; Alves 37'; Acuña (yellow card) 45+2'	Stadium: Finley Stadium; Attendance: 918; Referee: Carlos Pielago

=== Fall Playoffs ===
All eight NISA teams qualified for the 2020 Fall tournament, which will be hosted at Keyworth Stadium in Detroit, Michigan, beginning on September 21 ending with the final on October 2. The New York Cosmos were drawn into Group B of the two group tournament. Going into their final match, the Cosmos needed to win by five or more goals to advance to the Fall Semi-Finals. They failed to do so, and were eliminated when they lost 2 - 1.

==== Group stage ====
Pos	Team	Pld	W	D	L	GF	GA	GD	Pts	Qualification
1	Los Angeles Force	3	2	0	1	5	5	0	6	Advance to semifinals
2	Chattanooga FC	3	1	2	0	3	1	+2	5	Advance to semifinals
3	California United Strikers FC	3	1	1	1	5	4	+1	4	
4	New York Cosmos	3	0	1	2	1	4	−3	1	

Updated to match(es) played on September 28, 2020. Source: NISAofficial.com
Rules for classification: 1) Points, 2) Goal differential, 3) Goals scored, 4) Head-to-head record, 5) Coin toss

September 22, 2020 Group stage	California United Strikers FC	2–0	New York Cosmos	Hamtramck, Michigan
5:00 p.m. EDT	Kaemerle 39'; Thierjung 61'; Bryant (yellow card) 64'	NISA Report; FotMob Report; Broadcast		Stadium: Keyworth Stadium; Attendance: 0 Referee: Carter Brochu
Note: Game was played behind closed doors due to the COVID-19 pandemic

September 25, 2020 Group stage	Chattanooga FC	0–0	New York Cosmos	Hamtramck, Michigan
5:00 p.m. EDT	Hernandez (yellow card) 11'; Carr (yellow card) 33'; Bement (yellow card) 47'; Koloko (yellow card) 64'; Marcano (yellow card) 80'	NISA Report; FotMob Report; Broadcast	Cella (yellow card) 24'; G. Barone (yellow card) 50'	Stadium: Keyworth Stadium; Attendance: 0 Referee: Samuel Pizzimenti
Note: Game was played behind closed doors due to the COVID-19 pandemic

September 28, 2020 Group stage	New York Cosmos	1–2	Los Angeles Force	Hamtramck, Michigan
8:00 p.m. EDT	Cella (yellow card) 44'; Szetela (yellow card) 53'; Acuña (penalty missed) 63'; John-Brown 90+1'	NISA Report; FotMob Report; Broadcast	Gordillo 15'; Trejo 40'; Villatoro (yellow card) 62' (yellow-red card) 74'; Salazar (yellow card) 70'	Stadium: Keyworth Stadium; Attendance: 0 Referee: Jacob Little
Note: Game was played behind closed doors due to the COVID-19 pandemic

=== NISA Spring Season ===
On January 29, 2021, the Cosmos announced that the team would be pausing operations due to the COVID-19 pandemic.

=== U.S. Open Cup ===
The Cosmos went on hiatus prior to the U.S. Open Cup draw.

== Squad statistics ==
As of Match played September 28, 2020

=== Appearances and goals ===
No.	Pos	Nat	Player	Total		Fall Season		Fall Playoffs		Spring Season		U.S. Open Cup	
No.	Pos	Nat	Player	Apps	Goals	Apps	Goals	Apps	Goals	Apps	Goals	Apps	Goals
1	GK	(United States) USA	Jesse Corke	6	0	4+0	0	2+0	0	0+0	0	0+0	0
2	DF	(United States) USA	Armando Guarnera	1	0	1+0	0	0+0	0	0+0	0	0+0	0
3	DF	(United States) USA	Pedro Galvão	6	0	3+0	0	3+0	0	0+0	0	0+0	0
5	DF	(United States) USA	Matt Lewis	7	1	3+1	1	3+0	0	0+0	0	0+0	0
8	FW	(Cape Verde) CPV	Geo Alves	5	1	1+2	1	2+0	0	0+0	0	0+0	0
11	FW	(United States) USA	Aly Hassan	6	1	0+3	1	1+2	0	0+0	0	0+0	0
13	DF	(Albania) ALB	Ansi Agolli	6	0	3+0	0	3+0	0	0+0	0	0+0	0
14	MF	(United States) USA	Danny Szetela	6	0	3+0	0	3+0	0	0+0	0	0+0	0
15	FW	(Grenada) GRN	Shavon John-Brown	7	1	4+0	0	3+0	1	0+0	0	0+0	0
16	FW	(Mexico) MEX	Isaac Acuña	4	0	2+0	0	2+0	0	0+0	0	0+0	0
17	MF	(United States) USA	Salvatore Barone	3	0	1+1	0	0+1	0	0+0	0	0+0	0
20	FW	(Honduras) HON	Darwin Espinal	5	0	2+1	0	0+2	0	0+0	0	0+0	0
21	MF	(United States) USA	John Denis	3	0	0+0	0	0+3	0	0+0	0	0+0	0
23	DF	(United States) USA	Dominick Falanga	1	0	0+0	0	0+1	0	0+0	0	0+0	0
24	MF	(Italy) ITA	Mattia Cella	7	0	2+2	0	3+0	0	0+0	0	0+0	0
25	MF	(United States) USA	Giuseppe Barone	3	0	0+1	0	1+1	0	0+0	0	0+0	0
26	MF	(England) ENG	Charlie Ledula	4	0	1+1	0	1+1	0	0+0	0	0+0	0
27	DF	(United States) USA	Andrew Lubahn	4	0	2+2	0	0+0	0	0+0	0	0+0	0
28	MF	(Colombia) COL	Vincenzo Candela	3	0	3+0	0	0+0	0	0+0	0	0+0	0
31	GK	(United States) USA	Kevin Tenjo	1	0	0+0	0	1+0	0	0+0	0	0+0	0
32	DF	(Poland) POL	Konrad Plewa	7	0	4+0	0	3+0	0	0+0	0	0+0	0
Players who appeared for the New York Cosmos who are no longer at the club:
4	DF	(Italy) ITA	Emanuele Sembroni	2	0	2+0	0	0+0	0	0+0	0	0+0	0
7	FW	(Montenegro) MNE	Bljedi Bardic	6	2	3+1	2	2+0	0	0+0	0	0+0	0

=== Goal scorers ===
Place	Position	Nation	Number	Name	Fall Season	Fall Playoffs	Spring Season	U.S. Open Cup	Total
1	FW	(Montenegro)	7	Bljedi Bardic	2	0	0	0	2
2	DF	(United States)	5	Matt Lewis	1	0	0	0	1
2	FW	(Cape Verde)	8	Geo Alves	1	0	0	0	1
2	FW	(United States)	11	Aly Hassan	1	0	0	0	1
2	FW	(Grenada)	15	Shavon John-Brown	0	1	0	0	1
TOTALS					5	1	0	0	6

=== Disciplinary record ===
Number	Nation	Position	Name	Fall Season		Fall Playoffs		Spring Season		U.S. Open Cup		Total	
Number	Nation	Position	Name	Booked	Sent off (straight red)	Booked	Sent off (straight red)	Booked	Sent off (straight red)	Booked	Sent off (straight red)	Booked	Sent off (straight red)
4	(Italy)	DF	Emanuele Sembroni	0	1	0	0	0	0	0	0	0	1
7	(Montenegro)	FW	Bljedi Bardic	1	0	0	0	0	0	0	0	1	0
11	(United States)	FW	Aly Hassan	1	0	0	0	0	0	0	0	1	0
13	(Albania)	DF	Ansi Agolli	2	0	0	0	0	0	0	0	2	0
14	(United States)	MF	Danny Szetela	3	0	1	0	0	0	0	0	4	0
16	(Mexico)	FW	Isaac Acuña	1	0	0	0	0	0	0	0	1	0
24	(Italy)	MF	Mattia Cella	1	0	2	0	0	0	0	0	3	0
25	(United States)	MF	Giuseppe Barone	0	0	1	0	0	0	0	0	1	0
26	(England)	MF	Charlie Ledula	1	0	0	0	0	0	0	0	1	0
			TOTALS	10	1	4	0	0	0	0	0	14	1
