= Simão Mendes (footballer) =

Cape Verdean footballer and coach

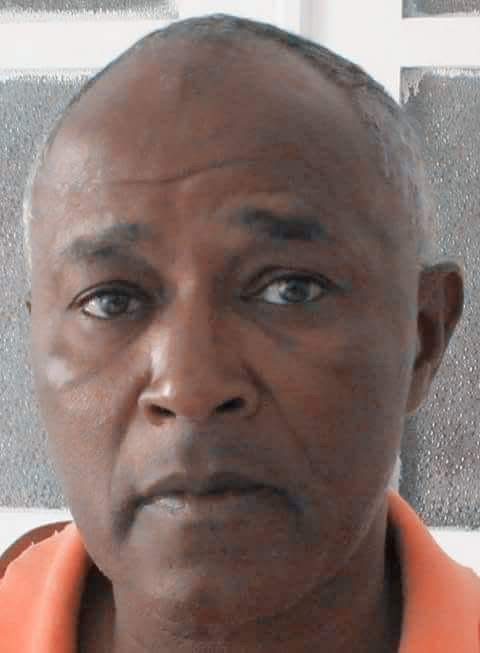

Personal information
- Full name: Simão Mendes
- Date of birth: March 16, 1950
- Place of birth: São Filipe, Fogo, Cape Verde
- Date of death: March 27, 2013 (aged 63)
- Place of death: São Filipe, Fogo, Cape Verde
- Position: Forward

Senior career*
Years	Team	Apps	(Gls)
- Vulcânicos FC
- Juventude FC
- Botafogo Futebol Clube (Cabo Verde)

Managerial career
- Botafogo Futebol Clube (Cabo Verde)
- Vulcânicos FC
- Juventude FC
- * Club domestic league appearances and goals

Simão Mendes (16 March 1950 – 27 March 2013), widely known by the nickname Papa di Socorro, was a Cape Verdean footballer and coach from the island of Fogo. He was recognised for his consistency as a forward during the 1970s and 1980s and later became an influential figure in the development of football on the island.

== Early life ==
Mendes was born in São Filipe, Fogo, where he grew up in a modest household. Before focusing fully on football, he worked at different times as a fisherman and as a janitor. In the early 1970s, he completed mandatory military service, first in Portugal and then in Angola between 1971 and 1973.

== Playing career ==
Mendes began competing with local teams in São Filipe, including Sporting (a local club), Juventude FC and later Vulcânicos FC. In 1974, he joined Botafogo FC (Cape Verde), the club where he spent the most successful years of his career. Known for his composure inside the penalty area and his disciplined playing style, he became one of the most reliable forwards in the regional league.

Across official and local competitions, Mendes is believed to have scored around 350 goals, a figure often cited by former teammates and local football historians.

While playing for Botafogo (Cabo Verde), he helped the club secure:

- 11 Fogo regional championships, including a streak of eight consecutive titles
- multiple regional top-scorer honours, including eight consecutive seasons between 1975 and 1983
- six straight victories in the annual São Filipe tournament

He was also part of the Botafogo squad that won the Cape Verde national championship in 1980 and contributed to several additional campaigns in which the club finished as national runner-up.

== Coaching career ==
After retiring as a player around 1990, Mendes transitioned into coaching. He managed Botafogo (Cabo Verde) for several seasons and won additional regional titles as a coach. He later coached Vulcânicos FC, Spartak, the Mosteiros regional selection, and Juventude FC. Throughout his coaching career, he earned a reputation for fairness, discipline and for mentoring younger athletes.

== Legacy ==
Outside of football, Mendes was active in the cultural life of São Filipe and was known for his participation in traditional São João Baptista festivities. He also worked for the former public supply company EMPA and served as a municipal representative in São Filipe, taking part in several community initiatives.

In recognition of his long connection to sports on the island, the main indoor arena in São Filipe became known as the Simão Mendes Sports Pavilion (Pavilhão Gimnodesportivo Simão Mendes).

== Personal life ==
Mendes was the grandfather of Cape Verdean-American professional footballer Geo Alves. According to a Burlington Free Press feature story, Mendes recruited a talented winger named Ildo Alves to his club and invited him to live in his home. It was there that Ildo met Mendes' daughter, Djalice, beginning the family line that later produced several footballers, including Geo Alves.

== Death ==
Simão Mendes died on 27 March 2013 at the regional hospital in São Filipe at the age of 63. He had been living with diabetes for many years, a condition that eventually led to the amputation of both legs shortly before his death. Despite his declining health, he continued to mentor young players and remained involved in local football until the final years of his life.
