= New York Cosmos Stadium =

Proposed stadium in Elmont, New York

- The original stadium proposal, with the Cross Island Parkway along the left
- Interactive map of New York Cosmos Stadium
- Location: Elmont, New York
- Coordinates: 40°42′31.5966″N 73°43′33.747″W
- Operator: New York Cosmos
- Capacity: 25,000

Construction
- Architect: Populous / Spector Group
- Structural engineer: Cameron Engineering
- General contractor: Turner Construction Company / McKissack & McKissack

Tenant
- New York Cosmos (NASL)

The New York Cosmos Stadium was a proposed 25,000-seat soccer-specific stadium and multipurpose facility. It was to be located in the New York metropolitan area in Nassau County, just over the city border. Plans were submitted to New York's Empire State Development Corporation. Upon completion, it would have been the home stadium of the New York Cosmos. The plan was abandoned in 2016.

== Plan ==
The stadium was intended to be part of a privately financed $400 million entertainment complex known as Elmont Town Crossings, designed to be built on the grounds of the Belmont Park racetrack. Along with the stadium, the project would have included a Cosmos museum, nearly 250,000 square feet of retail space and restaurants, a 175-room hotel, a pedestrian bridge over Hempstead Turnpike, better road access along the Hempstead Turnpike and Cross Island Parkway, improvements to the LIRR Belmont Park station, new parking space, a new 4.3-acre park, a youth soccer field, and remodeled recreational soccer fields nearby. Team officials said the project would have created 500 construction jobs and 3,000 permanent, full-time jobs.

A team of architects, engineers, and contractors were assembled for the stadium project including Populous, the Spector Group, Cameron Engineering, Turner Construction Company, and McKissack & McKissack.

== Uses ==
The Cosmos had said the stadium would be host not only to their own matches but also to national and international soccer events, other sports (such as rugby and lacrosse), music concerts, and other local sports teams.

== Controversies ==
Given the site's location away from subway lines, and close only to an infrequently-serviced Long Island Rail Road spur line, soccer consultant Jeff L’Hote questioned whether it would be "an attractive location" for a soccer stadium. Other commentators wondered if the plan was actually a serious proposal, pointing out that in its short history the Cosmos "tend to go for sizzle and then worry about substance".

Some sports commentators speculated that, if built, the Cosmos stadium might be used as leverage to join Major League Soccer on favorable terms if the league was unable to build its own stadium in the city. The Cosmos had originally turned down the opportunity to join MLS based on the expansion fee and the league's corporate structure.

The plan also faced opposition from local residents, who were concerned about building a stadium directly across the street from a suburban neighborhood.

== Timeline ==
In 2012, the New York Empire State Development Corporation issued a request for proposals (RFP) to develop an area of underutilized land at Belmont Park. In January 2013, the New York Cosmos submitted their plan.

While the RFPs were being evaluated, the New York Cosmos began play at James M. Shuart Stadium at Hofstra University. The new stadium was originally aimed to be completed in 2015 and opened by 2016, but had to be pushed back as time elapsed without a decision from the ESDC.

In November 2015, the ESDC asked all bidders to revise and re-submit their proposals. The Cosmos revised their plan to remove one parcel of land. The project was one of four proposals resubmitted to the ESDC.

On December 9, 2016, the Empire State Development Corporation officially withdrew the RFP, rejecting all four plans. After a second round of proposals (in which the Cosmos did not participate), the NHL's New York Islanders were chosen in December 2017 to develop the adjoining plot of land with an 18,000-seat arena. The site of the proposed stadium was redeveloped as Belmont Park Village, an open-air luxury outlet center modeled after Bicester Village in England, which opened in October 2024.
