= Geo Alves =

Cape Verdean-American footballer

Personal information
- Full name: Leandro Geovanny Mendes Alves
- Date of birth: August 24, 1995 (age 31)
- Place of birth: São Filipe, Cape Verde
- Height: 1.73 m (5 ft 8 in)
- Position: Forward

Team information
- Current team: Utica City
- Number: 7

Youth career
- Escola de Iniciação Desportiva “Sem Fronteiras”
- Laranjinha ("Lem")
- –2016: Académica do Fogo

College career
Years	Team	Apps	(Gls)
2016–2017	Dean College	25	(25)
2017–2019	Vermont Catamounts	50	(17)

Senior career*
Years	Team	Apps	(Gls)
2020	New York Cosmos	5	(1)
2021	Brockton FC United	25	(32)
2022–	Utica City	53	(16)
- * Club domestic league appearances and goals

Leandro Geovanny Mendes Alves (born August 24, 1995), known as Geo Alves, is a Cape Verdean–American footballer who plays as a forward for Utica City FC in the Major Arena Soccer League (MASL). Drafted 62nd overall by D.C. United in the 2019 MLS SuperDraft, he has pursued a professional career spanning college soccer, the National Independent Soccer Association (NISA), the United Premier Soccer League (UPSL), and indoor soccer.

== Early life and youth career ==
Born in São Filipe, Fogo, Cape Verde Alves grew up in the neighborhood of Santa Filomena. Early training was at Escola de Iniciação Desportiva "Sem Fronteiras", He then joined youth club Laranjinha ("Lem"), where he won three consecutive U‑17 regional championships and twice earned Best Player and Top Scorer honors, including at the Cape Verde National U‑17 Championship final.

Alves is the grandson of Cape Verdean footballer and coach Simão Mendes (footballer), known as "Papa di Socorro". A Burlington Free Press feature reported that Mendes recruited winger Ildo Alves to his club on Fogo and invited him to live in his home, where he met Mendes' daughter, Djalice — later becoming Geo Alves' parents.

He later played for Académica do Fogo in the 2012 national championship before emigrating mid-season to the United States. He is also known by the nicknames “Geo” and “Djoblas,” the latter being the name he uses on Instagram.

In 2014–15, while attending Shea High School in Pawtucket, Rhode Island, Alves was named the Gatorade Rhode Island Boys Soccer Player of the Year.

== Youth career ==
At Shea High School in Pawtucket, Rhode Island, Alves had a standout senior year (2014–15), scoring 29 goals with 16 assists, guiding the team to a 16–2 record and a berth in the Division I state championship game. He maintained a 3.32 GPA, was named First Team All‑State by The Providence Journal, and was honored as the 2014–15 Gatorade Rhode Island Boys Soccer Player of the Year.

Alves represented the New England Revolution U‑18 Academy in 2013, notably assisting and scoring a late winner in a 4–3 win over Oakwood SC.

== College career ==
Alves began at Dean College (2014–2016), competing in USCAA competition. As a sophomore he recorded 25 goals and 14 assists, earning USCAA All‑American First Team honors.

In summer 2016, while attending Dean College, he joined the New England Revolution U‑23 roster, training alongside academy and college players as part of the club’s developmental pathway.

He transferred to the NCAA Division I University of Vermont in 2016, where over three seasons with the Vermont Catamounts he made 50 appearances, scoring 17 goals and adding 4 assists. In 2018, he ranked 13th nationally in goals and earned academic and athletic honors including America East Striker of the Year, All-Conference First Team, and United Soccer Coaches All-East Region recognition.

== MLS recognition ==
Although Alves did not sign an MLS contract, he is officially listed on MLSsoccer.com as a draft-eligible player under the profile Geo Alves. He appears in the 2019 MLS SuperDraft list as Leandro "Geo" Alves (Vermont). D.C. United selected him 62nd overall in the third round; Vermont records cited him as scoring 19 goals and providing 9 assists in 37 games.

== Professional career ==
=== New York Cosmos (NISA) ===
In July 2020, Alves signed with the New York Cosmos to compete in NISA. He appeared in five matches, scored one goal, and logged approximately 122 minutes in the Fall 2020 season.

=== Brockton FC United ===
Since 2021, Alves has played for Brockton FC United (UPSL), representing Brockton’s Cape Verdean-American community. In the 2022 U.S. Open Cup qualifiers, he scored in the 74th minute and assisted another in Brockton’s 5–0 win over Philadelphia Lone Star, securing the club’s first-ever entry into the tournament proper. He also made 18 appearances during the 2025 UPSL New England Premier Division season.

=== Utica City FC ===
Alves joined Utica City FC in 2022. In the 2023–24 MASL indoor season, he logged 23 appearances, scored 8 goals, and led the team with 12 assists. He began the season wearing jersey number 80 and later switched to number 7.

== Playing style ==
A skilled and creative forward, Alves is known for his low center of gravity, technical dribbling, agility, and vision. He is typically employed as a winger or second striker and excels in tight spaces with precise passing and finishing.

== Personal life ==
Alves is the son of Ildo Alves and Djalice Mendes. He has six siblings: Euridice Fontes, Alessandro Fontes, Mauro Mendes, Delpio Alves, Rodry Alves and Nayla Alves. During his time at the University of Vermont, he majored in public communication.

== Media coverage ==
Alves has been the focus of varied media coverage:

- His signing with New York Cosmos was highlighted in official club announcements and a feature on his Cape Verdean background.
- Utica City FC match recaps featured his goals and assists, including a backheel finish and crucial setup plays.
- U.S. Open Cup spotlighted his performance in Brockton’s U.S. Open Cup qualifying win as a key moment in the team’s history.

== Honors ==
=== Youth ===
- 3× Fogo U‑17 Regional Champion (Laranjinha)
- U‑17 Best Player & Top Scorer – Regional & CVNC Final (×2)

=== High School ===
- Gatorade Rhode Island Boys Soccer Player of the Year: 2014–15
- 29 goals, 16 assists; 3.32 GPA; First Team All-State
- First Team All-State – Rhode Island (Shea High School)
- National Soccer Coaches Association of America (NSCAA) All-New England selection – 2014–15

=== College – University of Vermont ===
- America East Striker of the Year – 2018
- America East All-Conference First Team – 2017, 2018
- United Soccer Coaches All-East Region – 2017 (Second Team), 2018 (First Team)
- America East Fans’ Choice Player of the Year – 2017
- America East Academic Honor Roll – 2017
- America East Player of the Week – 2× (2017)
- USCAA All-America First Team – Dean College
- USCAA All-Region Team – Dean College

=== Professional ===
- Selected in MLS SuperDraft – Round 3, No. 62 (D.C. United, 2019)
- MLS SuperDraft Eligible List – 2019
- Scored in pro debut – New York Cosmos (Fall 2020)
- U.S. Open Cup qualifier standout – Brockton FC (2022)
- Team assist leader – Utica City FC (MASL 2023–24 season)
