= Emanuele Sembroni =

Italian footballer (born 1988)

Emmanuele Sembroni
Personal information
- Full name: Emmanuele Sembroni
- Date of birth: 27 January 1988 (age 38)
- Place of birth: Rome, Italy
- Height: 1.90 m (6 ft 3 in)
- Position: Defender

Youth career
- 2004–2008: Pescara
- 2007–2008: → Sampdoria (loan)

Senior career*
| Years | Team | Apps | (Gls) |
| 2008–2012 | Pescara | 30 | (1) |
| 2011–2012 | → Pergocrema (loan) | 12 | (0) |
| 2012–2013 | Aprilia | 31 | (0) |
| 2013–2014 | Pergolettese | 19 | (0) |
| 2014 | Salernitana | 9 | (0) |
| 2014–2015 | Chiasso | 18 | (0) |
| 2016 | Lupa Roma | 12 | (0) |
| 2016–2017 | L'Aquila | 20 | (0) |
| 2017–2018 | Francavilla | 15 | (0) |
| 2019 | New York Cosmos B | 13 | (2) |
| 2020 | New York Cosmos | 2 | (0) |

International career^{‡}
| 2005 | Italy U18 | 2 | (0) |
- * Club domestic league appearances and goals as of 9 September 2019 ‡ National team caps and goals as of 27 April 2019

Emmanuele Sembroni (born 27 January 1988) is an Italian footballer who most recently played as a defender for New York Cosmos in the National Independent Soccer Association.

Sembroni joined Lupa Roma from Chiasso on 4 January 2016 for free.
