= Long Island Chiefs =

Defunct American football team

- Founded: 1973
- Folded: 1973
- League: Atlantic Coast Football League
- Based in: Long Island, New York
- Stadium: Hofstra Stadium
- Championships: 0

The Long Island Chiefs were a minor league American football team based on Long Island, New York. They played one season in the Atlantic Coast Football League (ACFL) in 1973. The Chiefs played their home games at Hofstra Stadium in Hempstead, New York.

== History ==
In the Chiefs only season in the ACFL, they finished with a 2-10 record. The teams only wins came against the New York Crusaders and the Western Massachusetts Pioneers in September 1973. The leading scorer for the season was kicker Booth Lusteg with 25 points. Bruce Cerone and Lance George led Long Island with three touchdowns each on the season (18 points).

After experiencing financial problems at the beginning of the season, the team's license was revoked by the league in mid-October and their remaining games were forfeited.
