= New York Crusaders =

Defunct American football team

- Founded: 1973
- Folded: 1973
- League: Atlantic Coast Football League
- Based in: Mount Vernon, New York
- Stadium: Memorial Stadium

The New York Crusaders were a minor league American football team based in Mount Vernon, New York. They played one season in the Atlantic Coast Football League (ACFL) in 1973 and played their home games at Memorial Stadium in Mount Vernon. The team finished with a 2-9 record in its only season in 1973, with both wins coming against the Long Island Chiefs. Both of the wins were by forfeit after the Chiefs folded.
