= New York Cosmos (2013–2020) =

American professional soccer club in New York

- Full name: New York Cosmos
- Founded: August 1, 2010; 16 years ago
- Dissolved: January 29, 2021; 5 years ago
- Stadium: Mitchel Athletic Complex, Uniondale, New York
- Capacity: 10,102
- Coordinates: 40°43′26.40″N 73°35′50″W
- Owner: Rocco B. Commisso; Sela Sport; Seamus O'Brien
- Chairman: Rocco B. Commisso
- Website: nycosmos.com
Home colors	Away colors

The New York Cosmos was an American professional soccer club based in Uniondale, New York, that played in parts of six seasons between 2013 and 2020. The organization, established in August 2010, was a rebirth of the original New York Cosmos (1971–1985) which played in the original North American Soccer League, at the time the first division of American soccer.

The club competed in the second-division North American Soccer League (NASL) from 2013 to 2017, winning the Soccer Bowl Trophy in 2013, 2015, and 2016. The NASL suspended operations after the 2017 season and, following a two-year hiatus, the Cosmos joined the third-tier National Independent Soccer Association (NISA) for the 2020–21 season. The Cosmos withdrew after half a year for a second hiatus, citing the ongoing COVID-19 pandemic, though every other team in the league continued to play.

That second hiatus was made permanent in 2025, when it was announced that team owner Rocco B. Commisso had sold majority rights over the club's intellectual property to the USL League One's North Jersey Pro Soccer expansion team based in Paterson, New Jersey. That expansion team became the third incarnation of the New York Cosmos.

In less than five full seasons of play, the second incarnation of the Cosmos garnered a legacy of success on the field, poor attendance in the stands, and mismanagement, lawsuits, and unpaid bills off the field.

== History ==
=== 1985–2009: Fall of the original Cosmos and revival ===
The original New York Cosmos club began play in 1971 in the original North American Soccer League. The league ceased operations after the 1984 season, and the Cosmos were dissolved in 1985 after playing a season in the Major Indoor Soccer League. Peppe Pinton, a former employee of the club, "somehow managed to finagle" the company's assets when the club ceased operations, in part because nobody else was interested. Pinton put the trophies and equipment in a storage unit and used the name for "Cosmos Soccer Camp", a New Jersey day camp for children.

With the rise of Major League Soccer (MLS) during the late 1990s and 2000s, MLS had an interest in placing a second club in the New York market. In 2007, a supporters group named the "Borough Boys" was formed to push for a team in New York City itself, and in his 2010 "State of the League" address, Commissioner Don Garber confirmed that was indeed the goal. In the meantime, the original Cosmos were the subject of an ESPN documentary, Once in a Lifetime: The Extraordinary Story of the New York Cosmos, introducing the name to a new generation of fans. Garber also stated at one point that if MLS was to have a second New York club, it would be the Cosmos, and various New York City area entities approached Pinton about using the name. Even the existing MLS club in New York, the MetroStars, made relevant inquiries both before and after becoming the New York Red Bulls in 2006.

Pinton was initially reluctant to let the name be used by an MLS team, believing that the league was unwilling to respect the Cosmos' heritage; however, after seeing MLS reintroduce historical NASL names such as Seattle Sounders FC, Vancouver Whitecaps FC, and Portland Timbers, he changed his mind. In late August 2009, Pinton sold the name and image rights for $2 million to Paul Kemsley, the former vice-chairman of English Premier League club Tottenham Hotspur, who headed a group intent on establishing a new Cosmos team in MLS. At the time, Kemsley was best known as a failed property magnate and an assistant to Alan Sugar on the British version of The Apprentice. The ownership group announced the club's return on August 1, 2010.

Kemsley's group included English soccer businessman Terry Byrne as vice-chairman, as well as former Liverpool CEO Rick Parry. The investors funding the venture were rumored to be Saudi Arabian, although the full ownership group was not publicly announced at the time.

=== 2010–2012: "Selling Shirts" ===
One person familiar with Kemsley's plans for the Cosmos said his intention was "to build the brand and then build the team around that. It will not be cheap, it may not work, but it will be interesting."

To that end, Kemsley signed a deal with Umbro to produce a line of merchandise, including tshirts, jackets, and a "home jersey". Umbro followed this collection with a second "Blackout" line of Cosmos clothing in all-black with monochromatic black logos, supposedly inspired by the New York City blackout of 1977. The Blackout collection was unveiled at a pop-up shop on the Lower East Side, featuring a DJ playing period songs from 1977. With two full fashion lines before the club had joined a league or signed a single player, some journalists viewed this new Cosmos as a "money-grab" more interested in "selling shirts" than actually playing soccer.

The group's first high-profile hiring, announced on January 10, 2011, was former United States midfielder Cobi Jones as associate director of soccer. He was followed nine days later by Eric Cantona, who was hired as director of soccer. Cantona claimed "big plans" to build the club around homegrown talent, although the club would later claim in court that Cantona had never been given any actual responsibilities with the club, that he had only been a promotional figurehead. Jones left the club in 2012, and Cantona was fired from his role shortly thereafter. Neither departure was officially announced by the Cosmos.

The new team sought connections with stars from the original Cosmos team. One of their first acts was to sign Pelé to a five-year, five million dollar promotional contract as the team's "honorary president", and original Cosmos players Shep Messing, Carlos Alberto, and Giorgio Chinaglia were named "international ambassadors" for the club.

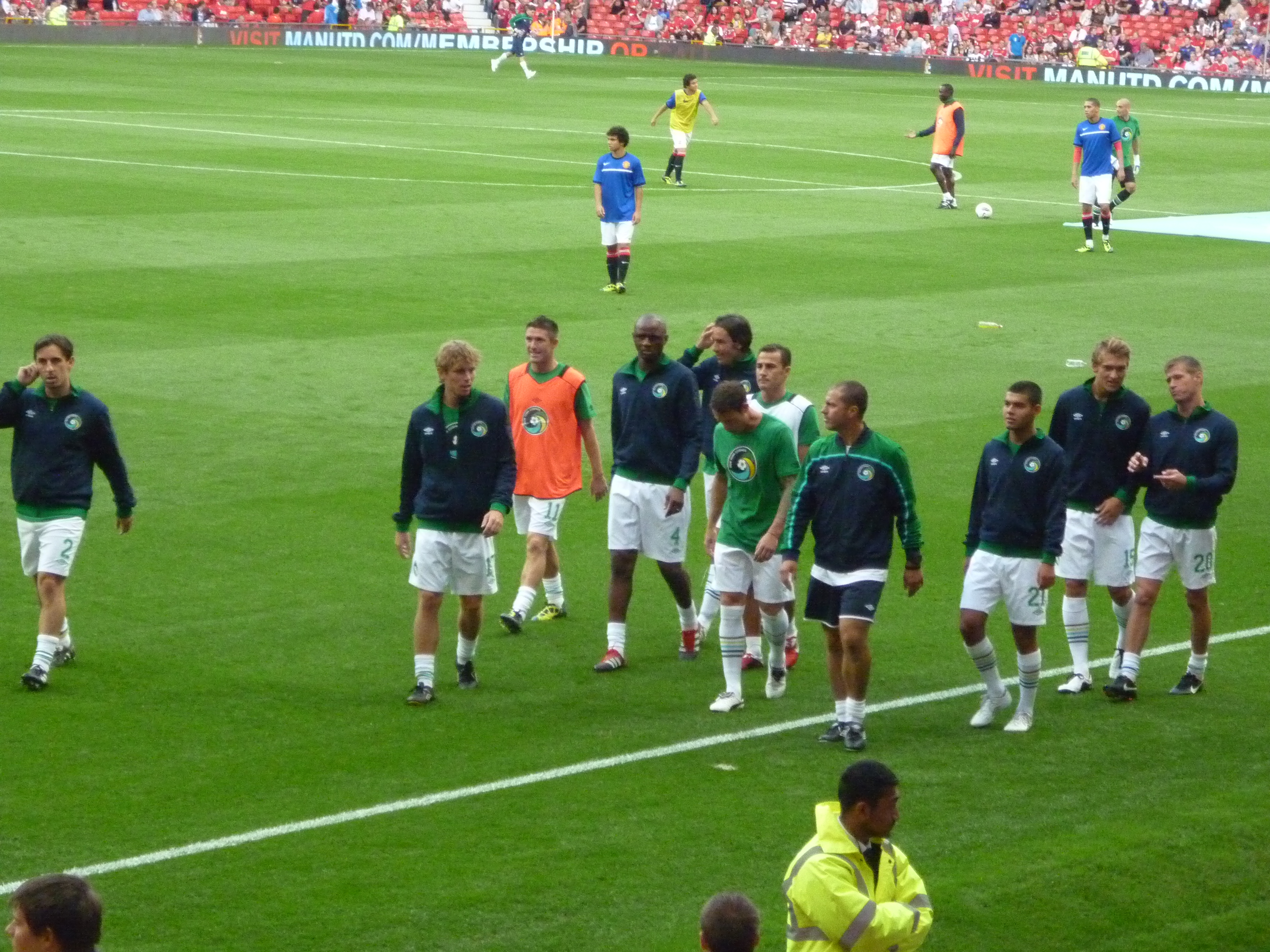
The Cosmos team of guest players at Old Trafford before the first match of the revived franchise v. Manchester United in August 2011

The new Cosmos' first match was on August 5, 2011, when they played in Paul Scholes's testimonial match against Cantona's former club Manchester United at Old Trafford. Cantona managed the Cosmos, with a roster consisting of a team of guest players from around the world.

On October 26, 2011, Kemsley and Byrne sold their shares to the team's majority owners, revealed to be Sela Sport, a sports marketing company itself owned by the Public Investment Fund, the sovereign wealth fund of Saudi Arabia. The departure of Kemsley was announced by the Cosmos with an official club statement saying that he wished "to pursue other interests and commitments", while the New York Post reported that he had been ousted by his partners, with Sela "apparently tired of the flamboyant Brit, who was long on flash but has to this point been short of substance". His replacement was not immediately announced. A further press release on November 2 gave news of the company buyout, restructuring and various unspecified management changes within the organization. The statement also said that the goal of the club remained the same under its new structure – "unequivocally" to become an MLS team. Around the same time, the entire unsold stock of Umbro merchandise was sold to a discount retailer "for pennies on the dollar".

Within weeks of his appointment, new chairman and CEO Seamus O'Brien had a series of meetings with MLS commissioner Don Garber about joining Major League Soccer. Garber was still eager to add the Cosmos to MLS, and offered O'Brien a spot in the league, but O'Brien balked at the $100M expansion fee, single-entity structure, and requirement that the league control the brand. O'Brien decided not to apply for MLS entry after all.

=== 2013–2015: Return to competitive league play ===
The Cosmos announced on July 12, 2012, that they would start competitive play in the second-tier North American Soccer League in 2013, but insisted in the same press release that the club was still bent on ultimately joining MLS. In November, Erik Stover was hired as the club's Chief Operating Officer. Stover had previously been managing director of the New York Red Bulls, during which time he had been named MLS Executive of the Year, and was seen as instrumental in getting their stadium built. The following week, Giovanni Savarese was confirmed as the team's first head coach. On December 11, former Red Bulls defender Carlos Mendes, a native of Long Island, became the new Cosmos' first senior player.

The Cosmos found immediate success in the NASL, winning the Fall Season Championship with a 9–4–1 (Win-Draw-Loss) record. On November 9, 2013, the team emerged as the winner of Soccer Bowl 2013, winning 1–0 against the spring season champions, the Atlanta Silverbacks. In June 2015 the New York Cosmos played a friendly against the Cuba national team, the first U.S. professional club to play in Cuba after the United States began normalizing relations with the island nation.

Despite that on-field success, the Cosmos struggled to draw fans at Hofstra.

In 2015, Cantona sued the club, claiming that they had failed to pay him almost one million dollars in salary and a four percent equity interest he had been promised. The parties settled in March 2017. Details of a potential settlement were not initially disclosed, although it later reported that Cantona received £780,000 from the Cosmos.

After the Cosmos won the 2016 NASL Championship Final, supporters publicly called for a meeting with the club's owners, citing a lack of transparency from management and concerns over the club's future.

=== 2016–2019: Financial struggles, sale, and hiatus ===
In November 2016, there were reports the team was in dire financial condition, including furloughs for 60–80% of the staff and an inability to make payroll. Later reports indicated that the Cosmos had lost over thirty million dollars since beginning play in 2013, including as much as $10 million in 2016. The Guardian pointed out that "(d)espite the team’s on-field achievements, the Cosmos have been plagued by mismanagement, dwindling attendance and practical irrelevance in the New York market."

On December 6, 2016, various media outlets began reporting that the Cosmos had released all players and coaching staff from their contracts, and that office staff had not been paid in up to six weeks. Cosmos supporters launched an online campaign to raise funds for affected employees. On December 9, most of the club's employees were officially laid off.

In an interview with the Guardian, O'Brien admitted the financial losses but denied that the club was in danger of going out of business, insisting that they had "zero debt". Empire of Soccer pointed out that while O'Brien was saying that, the Cosmos were being sued for over $50,000 in unpaid rent on their Garden City, Long Island offices. Despite O'Brien's public statements, the team came within a few hours of going out of business altogether, as he came to an agreement to sell the Cosmos brand to a private equity firm. On December 15, 2016, the day O'Brien was to finalize that deal, he began negotiations with Rocco B. Commisso, a cable television executive with a lifelong interest in soccer. On January 10, 2017, it was announced that Commisso purchased the majority interest in the Cosmos. His investment kept the club and league from folding and allowed both to return for the 2017 NASL season. ESPN reported that O'Brien and Sela Sport retained a minority stake in the club, although supporters claimed that Commisso assured them that Sela Sport was no longer part of the ownership.

On December 13, 2017, the Cosmos announced that Savarese had left the club "to pursue other coaching opportunities".

Following the cancellation of the NASL's 2018 season, the league announced that the Cosmos would take a hiatus while exploring options to return to the field in 2019. In September 2018, Chief Operating Officer Erik Stover stepped down to become the CEO of a local soccer academy. For the 2018 and 2019 seasons, some of the Cosmos players joined the organization's second team, New York Cosmos B, in the semi-professional National Premier Soccer League (NPSL).

On November 15, 2018, the NPSL announced that the Cosmos would be a founding member in a new professional league, commencing with the NPSL Founders Cup tournament from August to November 2019, followed by a full league schedule in 2020 at either division 2 or 3 level. This however, never came to be and the Founders Cup was later renamed to the Members Cup which Cosmos B took part in.

On May 23, 2019, the team played its first game since 2017 against 2. Bundesliga side FC St. Pauli at Rocco B. Commisso Soccer Stadium, which New York won 2–1. On November 20, 2019, the club announced their intention of joining the third-division National Independent Soccer Association for their Fall 2020 season.

=== 2020–2025: New league, second hiatus, and sale ===
The Cosmos made their NISA debut in the Fall 2020 season. They finished third in the Eastern Conference and exited the playoffs in the group stage.

At the same time, owner Rocco Commisso was accused of "back burnering" the Cosmos in favor of his investment in Italian Serie A club ACF Fiorentina, which he had purchased in 2019. At the same time Commisso was spending $55 million on a new training facility for Fiorentina, the Cosmos budget was reduced to a minimum, with matches moved from their home stadium in Brooklyn to a training facility in suburban Hempstead.

On January 29, 2021, the club announced that it "paused team operations" and would not compete in the Spring 2021 NISA season. They cited the COVID-19 pandemic, although every other team in the league continued to play. Supporters and people associated with the Cosmos blamed owner Rocco Commisso for the hiatus, accusing Commisso of "departing in a cowardly fashion" and "giving up on the Cosmos" while prioritizing his other business interests.

On February 5, 2025, Admiral Sportswear announced it had partnered with the owners of the Cosmos brand to launch a new Cosmos fashion line, based around the original club's 1979 uniform.

On July 10, 2025, it was announced that Commisso had sold the Cosmos name and identity to the USL League One's North Jersey Pro Soccer expansion team in Paterson, New Jersey, and that the club would use the New York Cosmos name. Commisso joined the new team as a minority owner.

== Results ==
=== Year-by-year ===
Season	Div	League	Phase	Pos.	Pl.	W	D	L	GS	GA	Pts.	Overall	Playoffs	U.S. Open Cup	Top goalscorer		Coach
Season	Div	League	Phase	Pos.	Pl.	W	D	L	GS	GA	Pts.	Overall	Playoffs	U.S. Open Cup	Name	League	Coach
2013	2	NASL	Spring	Did not participate								5th	Champion	Ineligible	(Spain) Marcos Senna (Venezuela) Diomar Díaz	5	(Venezuela) Giovanni Savarese
2013	2	NASL	Fall	1st	15	10	4	1	23	12	34	5th	Champion	Ineligible	(Spain) Marcos Senna (Venezuela) Diomar Díaz	5	(Venezuela) Giovanni Savarese
2014	2	NASL	Spring	2nd	9	6	1	2	14	3	19	3rd	Semifinals	Fifth round	(Norway) Mads Stokkelien	7	(Venezuela) Giovanni Savarese
2014	2	NASL	Fall	6th	18	5	8	5	23	24	23	3rd	Semifinals	Fifth round	(Norway) Mads Stokkelien	7	(Venezuela) Giovanni Savarese
2015	2	NASL	Spring	1st	10	5	5	0	18	9	20	1st	Champion	Fifth round	(Brazil) Leo Fernandes (Spain) Raúl	8	(Venezuela) Giovanni Savarese
2015	2	NASL	Fall	3rd	20	10	6	4	31	21	36	1st	Champion	Fifth round	(Brazil) Leo Fernandes (Spain) Raúl	8	(Venezuela) Giovanni Savarese
2016	2	NASL	Spring	2nd	10	6	0	4	15	8	18	1st	Champion	Round of 16	(Venezuela) Juan Arango	15	(Venezuela) Giovanni Savarese
2016	2	NASL	Fall	1st	22	14	5	3	44	21	47	1st	Champion	Round of 16	(Venezuela) Juan Arango	15	(Venezuela) Giovanni Savarese
2017	2	NASL	Spring	3rd	16	6	6	4	22	21	24	4th	Runner-up	Second round	(Argentina) Emmanuel Ledesma	10	(Venezuela) Giovanni Savarese
2017	2	NASL	Fall	4th	16	4	9	3	34	30	21	4th	Runner-up	Second round	(Argentina) Emmanuel Ledesma	10	(Venezuela) Giovanni Savarese
2018	On hiatus																
2019	On hiatus																
2020–21	3	NISA	Fall, Eastern	3rd	4	1	2	1	5	4	5	N/A	Group stage	Did not participate	(Montenegro) Bljedi Bardic	2	(United States) Carlos Mendes
2020–21	3	NISA	Spring	Did not participate								N/A	N/A	Did not participate	(Montenegro) Bljedi Bardic	2	(United States) Carlos Mendes

== Stadium ==
Beginning with its inaugural season in 2013, the club played its home games at James M. Shuart Stadium, on the campus of Hofstra University in Hempstead, New York, about 20 miles (32 km) east of downtown New York City on Long Island. The stadium seats 11,929, and was home to the original Cosmos club during the 1972 and 1973 seasons.

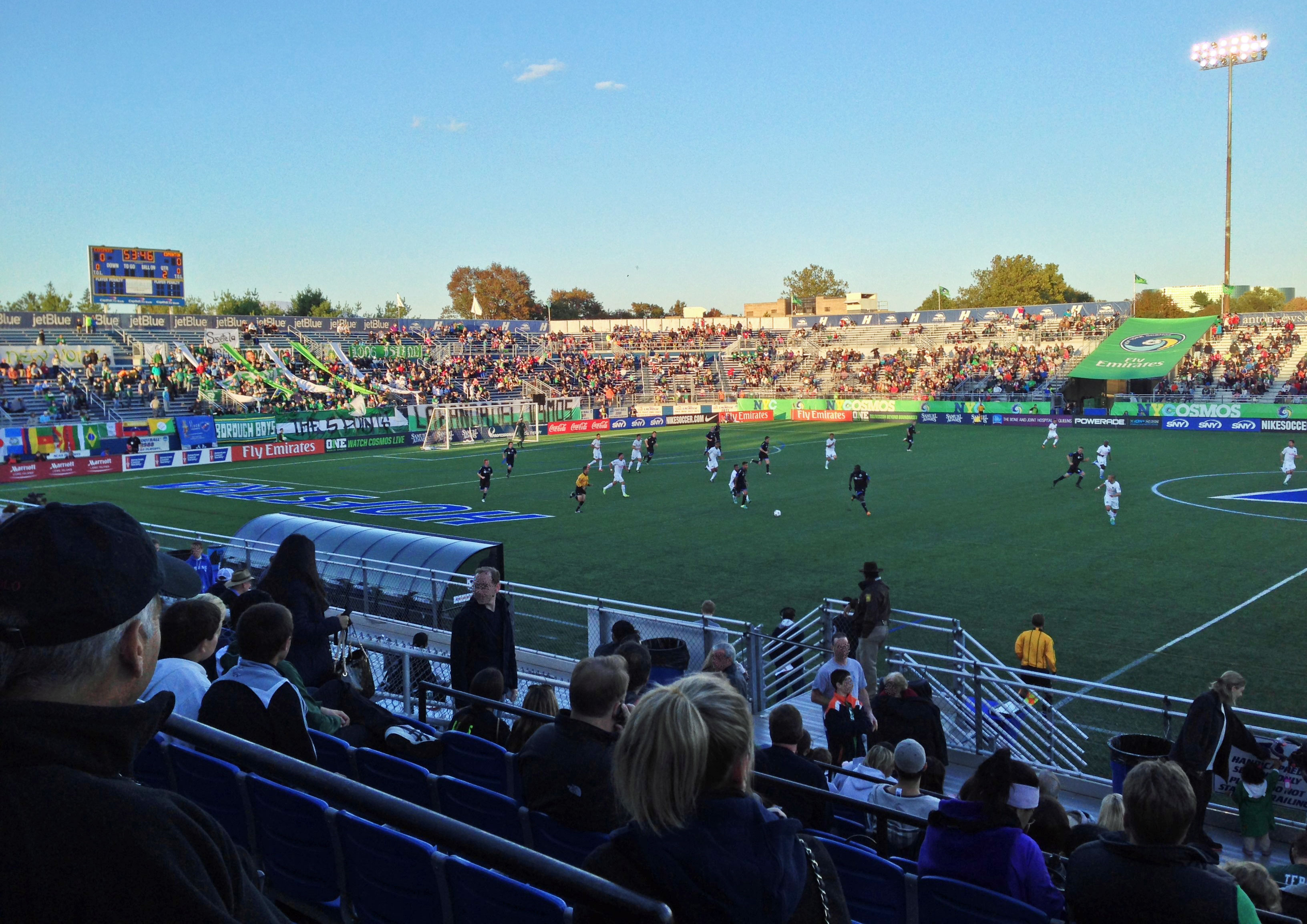
5,624 fans watch an October 2013 match at Hofstra between the Cosmos and FC Edmonton

The Cosmos struggled to draw fans to Hofstra, raising concerns about the club's sustainability. In 2015 they experimented with matches at MCU Park, a minor-league baseball stadium in the Coney Island section of Brooklyn, hosting a regular season match against the Ottawa Fury and a post season match against the Fort Lauderdale Strikers.

The Cosmos proposed to construct a new 25,000-seat stadium at a parking lot next to the Belmont Park racetrack in Elmont, in Nassau County just over the border with Queens. Plans for the $400 million project were submitted to the Empire State Development Corporation as a response to a request for proposal. On December 9, 2016, the Empire State Development Corporation officially withdrew the RFP and rejected all four proposals, including that of the Cosmos.

Scheduling conflicts prevented the Cosmos from using Shuart Stadium for the 2016 Championship Final, and they were forced to rent another stadium. They eventually settled on Belson Stadium on the campus of St. John's University. The announcement that the league's championship game would be played in a 2,200-seat venue prompted derision from fans of the club and league, who took to social media with the hashtag #BiggerThanBelson. The Final was played at Belson but failed to sell out, with only 2,150 tickets sold.

Following the Belson Stadium debacle, the Cosmos moved their 2017 home games to MCU Park in Brooklyn. The minor-league venue was reportedly too expensive for the Cosmos to rent, and after sitting out the 2018 and 2019 season, the Cosmos announced that they would play their 2020 home games at Mitchel Athletic Complex in Uniondale. Just blocks from their original home at Shuart Stadium, Mitchel had been the team's training facility since 2013.

== Kits and crest ==
Kit suppliers and shirt sponsors
Period	Kit supplier	Shirt sponsor	Notes
2011	Umbro	None	Only worn once, by guest players in a 2011 testimonial match
2012	Umbro	None	Only worn once, by guest players in a 2011 testimonial match
2013	Umbro	None	Only worn once, by guest players in a 2011 testimonial match
2013	Nike	Emirates	Starting with the 2013 NASL Fall season.
2014	Nike	Emirates	
2015	Nike	Emirates	
2016	Under Armour	Emirates	
2017	Inaria	Emirates	
2018	Inaria	Mediacom	Did not play
2019	Inaria	Mediacom	Did not play
2020	Inaria	Mediacom	

== Players and staff ==
=== Club captains ===
Years	Name	Nation
2013–2017	Carlos Mendes	United States
2020	Danny Szetela	United States

=== Retired numbers ===
Numbers retired belong to players from the original club. This second incarnation of the franchise retired only one number, Giorgio Chinaglia's #9 in 2014 so number 10 had been previously retired in 1977 by the original club.

No.	Player	Nation	Pos.	Tenure	No retired	Ref
9	Giorgio Chinaglia	Italy	FW	1976–1983	8 Jun 2014	
10	Pelé	Brazil	FW	1975–1977	1 Oct 1977	

== Ownership and team management ==
=== Owners ===
At the time of the club's folding, the Chairman and CEO was cable television executive Rocco B. Commisso. Other members of the ownership group included former club chairman Seamus O'Brien, and Sela Sport, a marketing company owned by the government of Saudi Arabia.

== Supporters ==
The original supporters group was the Borough Boys Supporters Club, formed in 2007 to lobby MLS Commissioner Don Garber for a club based in New York City. After Kemsley's group bought the Cosmos name in late 2009, the Borough Boys became their first supporters group, believing that the Cosmos represented "the best choice for MLS expansion", and remained with the club even after New York City FC was announced as the twentieth MLS club in May 2013.

The Borough Boys were eventually joined by two additional supporters groups: La Banda del Cosmos, a barra brava for Latin American fans, and The Cross Island Crew, primarily for fans on Long Island. The Cross Island Crew was founded as "Sagan's Army", in a reference to Carl Sagan, but re-branded in December 2013.

In June 2017, the Borough Boys' podcast/website This is Cosmos Country announced that they would no longer be covering the Cosmos, following a dispute with the club. In an interview with Empire of Soccer, they raised questions about the ownership of the Cosmos, including wondering whether Sela Sport still had an interest. After the EoS article was published, TICC founder Luis Hernandez received a phone call from Cosmos Senior Vice President Joe Barone. Barone complained about TICC's coverage of the Cosmos, and claimed to have himself received an angry phone call from Commisso, then in Saudi Arabia for a friendly match. Hernandez said "We feel we just have to walk away. They're trying to bully us. We love the team. We're fans. We support the on-field product. We're behind [Head Coach Giovanni Savarese], his players and staff. It's an unfortunate situation. None of us want to be part of this anymore." Commisso later denied making such a call to Barone, saying "Somebody lied." As of late 2017, the Borough Boys no longer had "any official relationship" with the club.

== Broadcasting ==
The Cosmos were originally broadcast by One World Sports, a network that was run by the team's chairman Seamus O'Brien, and live or tape-delayed on SportsNet New York. The majority of the games featured the on-air team of play-by-play announcer JP Dellacamera and Janusz Michallik as the color analyst. One World Sports also produced Cosmos Classics, an original series featuring historic Cosmos matches from the 1970s and 1980s.

On March 16, 2017, coinciding with the team's new ownership, and the sale of One World Sports to Eleven Sports, the Cosmos announced a new broadcast deal with MSG Network and WPIX-TV. Ed Cohen and Jonathan Yardley handled play-by-play, alongside Sal Rosamilia and Janusz Michallik as color analysts.

== Honors ==
=== Domestic ===
Honor		Champions	Runners-up
North American Soccer League	NASL Championship Final	2013, 2015, 2016	2017
North American Soccer League	Spring championship	2015	2014, 2016
North American Soccer League	Fall championship	2013, 2016	

=== International ===
- Lunar New Year Cup

Winners: 2015

== New York Cosmos B ==
In January 2015, the Cosmos announced it would be fielding a team in the National Premier Soccer League for the upcoming season. The team, New York Cosmos B, would act as a reserve side and would be coached by first team assistant coach Alecko Eskandarian.

The team won the NPSL National Championship in its first season, going undefeated through 17 games and beating Chattanooga FC in the National Final on August 8. Between 2015 and 2019, the team finished first in the NPSL's North Atlantic Conference four times and reached the National Final again in 2019.

The squad did not return for the 2020 NPSL season.

== Youth academy ==
Following its foundation in August 2010, the Cosmos entered into an arrangement with youth development organization Blau Weiss Gottschee in which the Gottschee teams would play under the name New York Cosmos Academy. A few weeks later, the club entered into a similar partnership with the Los Angeles Futbol Club in Pasadena, California, to run a west-coast youth academy called "Cosmos Academy West". While Cosmos Academy West existed, the Cosmos Academy based in Queens was called "Cosmos Academy East".

This approach of sponsoring established youth organizations, and having their teams play in Cosmos branding, was initially successful. The Cosmos were able to capitalize on decades of youth development. At the end of 2010, Cosmos Academy West was ranked by Soccer America as the third best boys' club in the United States and the top boys' club in California. The Spring 2011 roster for the US under-17 team included three Cosmos Academy East players, more at the time than any MLS team academy.

The Cosmos Academy eventually competed at various levels of the U.S. Soccer Development Academy, fielding teams in the under-9 to under-18 age groups. An under-23 Cosmos side was accepted into the USL Premier Development League (PDL), the fourth tier of the United States soccer pyramid, in May 2011, and was expected to join for the 2012 season. In preparation for this it played exhibition matches against existing PDL clubs during 2011, coached by Savarese. However, it did not take part in the 2012 PDL season.

Cracks quickly started to form between the Cosmos and their youth soccer partners. Los Angeles Futbol Club abruptly terminated its contract with the Cosmos in February 2011, with no public explanation. Bleacher Report called the cancellation "embarrassing" for the Cosmos and "a poor demonstration of the (Cosmos’s) commitment to grassroots and youth soccer". Following the loss of LAFC, the Cosmos tried to develop a new Cosmos Academy West on their own, but within months had slashed funding for the project. Cosmos Academy West officially disbanded in August 2011, and its operations were folded into those of MLS club Chivas USA.

On November 8, 2011, Blau Weiss Gottschee filed a lawsuit against the Cosmos, claiming that the Cosmos had failed to make any of its contractually-obligated payments and that as a result Gottschee had been forced to restore the tuition, transport and training fees which players had been required to pay before the 2010 deal. At the time the suit was filed, the Cosmos reportedly owed Blau Weiss Gottschee $210,000 in missed payments. Gotchee later joined New York City FC's development league.

In fall of 2014, the Cosmos announced that recently signed Raúl González Blanco would, upon his retirement from playing, assume a full-time role overseeing a new Cosmos academy which scheduled to begin operations in 2015. In December 2015, US Soccer gave the Cosmos approval to begin developing youth players, granting the club initial approval to field a U-12 team. However, when Raúl retired in that year, he instead took a position with La Liga, overseeing its offices in the United States, and his son Hugo went into the New York City FC academy.

In May 2020, the Cosmos indefinitely suspended their youth academy. Then-Chief Operating Officer Erik Stover said "At this moment, we simply don't have a clear development pathway for the players. That being said, we don’t think it is fair to ask parents and players to continue to invest their time and money in the academy system".

== Failed Major League Soccer expansion ==
At the time of the Cosmos' return in 2010, MLS was made up of 16 franchises, with three new teams set to join over the following two seasons: Vancouver Whitecaps FC and Portland Timbers in 2011, and the Montreal Impact in 2012. Newsday reported in late April 2011 that the league was committed to placing the next franchise in the New York borough of Queens if a deal could be reached. Terry Byrne said in July 2011 that the stadium was the biggest factor regarding the Cosmos' accession to MLS. "The league wants us to demonstrate that we are capable of taking a stadium [area] and building a stadium," he said.

Working alongside New York Mayor Michael Bloomberg, the Cosmos sought a location within New York City's boroughs rather than a surrounding city (which would distinguish them from the Red Bulls, based in Harrison, New Jersey). Over a dozen locations around Queens, The Bronx, and Manhattan were marked out in March 2011, narrowed down to four sites by the end of July; two in Queens and one each in Brooklyn and "uptown" Manhattan.

Apart from the stadium, an issue regarding MLS membership was the franchise fee that the Cosmos would have to pay to the league. When the club first announced its intention to join, the price stood at $40 million, but by the end of July 2011 the fee for any expansion team playing in New York had risen to $70 million, a 57% rise from the entry price paid by Montreal. By the end of 2011, the Cosmos decided not to apply for an MLS franchise after all, in part because they rejected the league's single entity structure, and because they did not want to relinquish marketing rights to their name and logo.

Following the Cosmos' decision not to apply, Major League Soccer announced in May 2013 that their 20th franchise would be a different New York City–based team, New York City FC, a new team co-owned by City Football Group (owners of Premier League team Manchester City) and Major League Baseball team the New York Yankees. Cosmos chairman Seamus O'Brien, however, noted that London had fourteen professional soccer teams, so New York City could "handle three."

In February 2014, MLS commissioner Don Garber named three other markets as candidates for the final expansion team that would get the league's stated 24-team target by 2020, and on April 25, 2014, he told Associated Press's sports editors that there would not be a third MLS team in New York.

== See also ==
- Soccer in New York City
