= 2016 Major League Lacrosse season =

2016 MLL season
- League: Major League Lacrosse
- Sport: Field lacrosse
- Duration: April - August 2016
- Teams: 9

2016
- Season MVP: Tom Schreiber
- Finals champions: Denver Outlaws
- Runners-up: Ohio Machine

MLL seasons
- ← 2015 season 2017 season →

The 2016 Major League Lacrosse season was the 16th season of Major League Lacrosse. The season featured 9 teams (all in the United States) after the addition of the Atlanta Blaze via expansion. It was the first season since 2008 that the league fielded more than eight teams. The defending champion New York Lizards were coming off their third Steinfeld Cup victory in franchise history and first since 2003 after defeating the Rochester Rattlers 15–12 August 8, 2015 at Fifth Third Bank Stadium in Kennesaw, Georgia. On August 20, the Denver Outlaws won their second Steinfeld Cup trophy in three years, coming back to defeat the Ohio Machine, 19–18.

The 2016 season was a particularly unusual one. Going into the final week of the regular season, all four playoff spots were still up for grabs. In the end, seven teams finished at 8–6. With the tiebreaker procedures, the teams that were rewarded with a playoff berth were the Ohio Machine, New York Lizards, Denver Outlaws (who had started the season 2–6), and the Charlotte Hounds. The 8–6 teams left out of the postseason were the Boston Cannons, Chesapeake Bayhawks, and Rochester Rattlers. 2016 was the first season since the season expanded to 14 games and no team finished with more than eight wins.

== Milestones & events ==
- August 8, 2015 - An expansion team is announced to play in Atlanta as the Blaze.
- October 27, 2015 - The Machine announce they are changing venues to Panther Stadium in downtown Columbus, home to the Ohio Dominican Panthers. The Machine spent their first four seasons at Selby Field in Delaware, Ohio.
- March 9 - The MLL announced the two semifinals games would be hosted at two separate neutral locations for the first time in league history. One would be hosted at Fairfield University's Rafferty Stadium in Connecticut and another at the National Sports Center Stadium in Blaine, Minnesota north of Minneapolis, Minnesota.
- March 23 - The MLL announces the 2016 Steinfeld Cup would be held in Atlanta at Fifth Third Bank Stadium. It will be the third consecutive championship game held in greater Atlanta. The 2015 championship game was the most attended game in Steinfeld Cup history.
- May 2 - The Rochester Rattlers announced they would move to Wegmans Sports Complex at the Aquinas Institute. Even though this announcement was made after the season began, the Rattlers' 2016 home opener was not until May 28 against the Bayhawks.

=== Coaching changes ===
- Atlanta Blaze - John Tucker, becomes the first head coach and general manager of the expansion franchise. On July 21, 2016, the Blaze fired Tucker after a 3–7 start and replaced him with assistant head coach Dave Huntley.
- Boston Cannons - Sean Quirk replaced John Tucker, who became the first head coach and general manager of the expansion team Atlanta Blaze.
- Charlotte Hounds - Jim Stagnitta becomes the second head coach in franchise history, replacing Mike Cerino who would transition into a front office role. Cerino lead the team to a 19–37 record in its first four seasons.
- Chesapeake Bayhawks - Brian Reese, Bayhawk assistant and former head coach of the Outlaws, replaced Dave Cottle after his retirement.

== Teams ==
=== Stadiums and locations ===
Atlanta Blaze	Boston Cannons	Charlotte Hounds	Chesapeake Bayhawks
Fifth Third Bank Stadium	Harvard Stadium	American Legion Memorial Stadium	Navy–Marine Corps Memorial Stadium
Capacity: 8,318	Capacity: 30,323	Capacity: 21,000	Capacity: 34,000

Locations of teams for the 2016 Major League Lacrosse season
Active Teams

Denver Outlaws	Florida Launch	New York Lizards	Ohio Machine	Rochester Rattlers
Sports Authority Field at Mile High	FAU Stadium	James M. Shuart Stadium	Panther Stadium	Wegmans Sports Complex
Capacity: 76,125	Capacity: 29,419	Capacity: 11,929	Capacity: 3,000	Capacity: 5,000

== Standings ==
Playoff Seed

2016 Major League Lacrosse Standings
	W	L	PCT	GB	GF	2ptGF	GA	2ptGA
Ohio Machine	8	6	.571	-	209	7	183	5
New York Lizards	8	6	.571	-	218	12	226	10
Denver Outlaws	8	6	.571	-	201	7	206	9
Charlotte Hounds	8	6	.571	-	190	7	187	5
Boston Cannons	8	6	.571	-	179	11	183	3
Rochester Rattlers	8	6	.571	-	205	2	167	9
Chesapeake Bayhawks	8	6	.571	-	190	7	190	4
Atlanta Blaze	4	10	.286	4	189	10	208	11
Florida Launch	3	11	.214	5	168	6	199	10

== All Star Game ==
The 2016 All Star Game took place in Orange County, California at Cal State Fullerton's Titan Stadium on July 9. In the first professional lacrosse game in Southern California since the Los Angeles Riptide left, Team Riptide narrowly defeated Team Rolling Thunder, 21–20 in front of 4,217 fans. Goaltender for the Ohio Machine and Team Riptide, Scotty Rodgers, went onto win the MVP award.

== Playoffs ==
On March 9, the league announced the two semifinals games would be held at separate neutral locations for the first time ever. One (Denver vs. New York) was held in Fairfield, Connecticut, and the other (Charlotte vs. Ohio) was held in Blaine, Minnesota. For the third straight year, the championship game was held at Fifth Third Bank Stadium in Atlanta.

Semifinals; August 13
1	Ohio	16
4	Charlotte	10
2	New York	17
3	Denver	20

Championship; August 20
1	Ohio	18
3	Denver	19
