= Fortress Obetz =

Sports and entertainment complex in Obetz, Ohio

- The Fortress
- Interactive map of Fortress Obetz
- Location: Obetz, Ohio
- Coordinates: 39.8871427°N 82.9467764°W
- Owner: City of Obetz
- Operator: City of Obetz
- Capacity: 6,500
- Surface: SportsGrass (synthetic)

Construction
- Groundbreaking: 2016
- Built: 2017
- Opened: May 6, 2017
- Cost: $35 million

Tenant
- Ohio Machine (MLL) (2017–2018)

Website
- Fortress Obetz

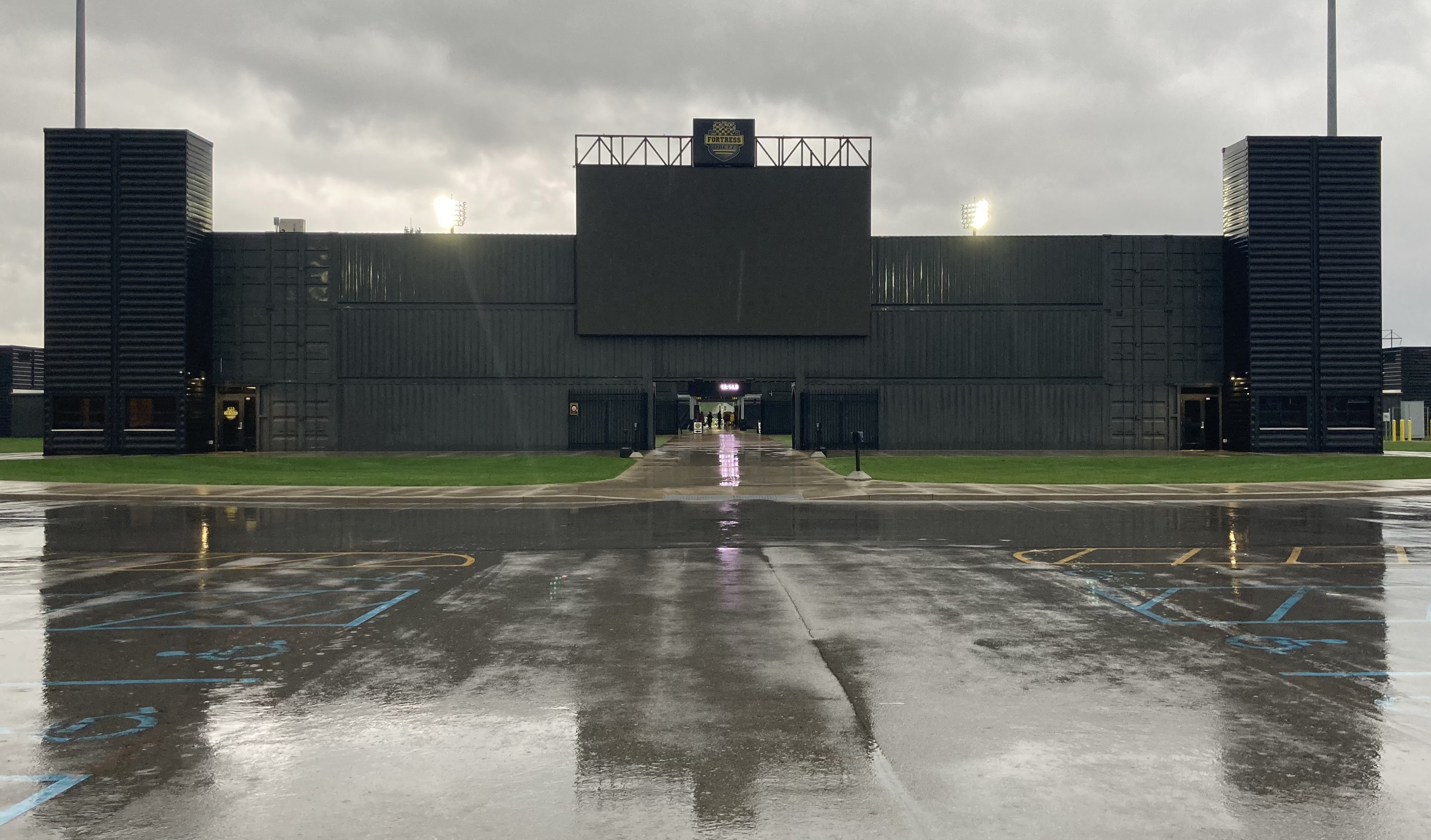
Main entrance of Fortress Obetz athletic facility in Obetz, OH

Fortress Obetz is a multi-purpose sports and entertainment complex in Obetz, Ohio. Its bleacher system holds 6,500 people. Including standing room for events such as concerts, Fortress Obetz can hold nearly 20,000 people. It opened in 2017 on the site of the former Columbus Motor Speedway.

== History ==
In September 2016, Obetz purchased the Columbus Motor Speedway. Obetz developed it into a community asset to host concerts, farmers’ markets, trade shows, sporting events including rugby, festivals, and other community activities. This 50 acre, $15 million project was completed in the fall of 2017. The first event was held on May 6, 2017, for the first home game of the Ohio Machine against the Rochester Rattlers. Later that year, Fortress Obetz hosted the high school football game between Hamilton Township and Groveport Madison on August 31, 2017. Even though Obetz is home to these two school districts, they had not competed against each other in football in over 50 years. In its inaugural year, Fortress Obetz held events such as the annual Obetz Zucchinifest and Fashion Meets Music Festival. Currently, the home field for Bishop Ready High School football team.

== Fortress Obetz features ==
Fortress Obetz seats 6,500 in multiple seating levels. The stadium has multiple video boards. Additionally, the facility features concessions, bathroom facilities, parking, and premium hospitality options. An example of modular construction, Fortress Obetz was built out of 122 shipping containers by Falcon Structures of Manor, TX.

Features include:

- 6,500 seat grandstand, 1,100 flip down seats, 2,000 bench back seats, and 3,400 bleacher seats
- Press box
- Advanced synthetic turf field meets World Rugby Regulation 22 and FIFA-recommended 2 Star
- Five video boards, integrated scoreboards, and field clocks
- Remote control camera system
- 18,000 square foot Fortress building
- 15,000 square foot courtyard
- VIP Seating
- Two Locker rooms
- Officials' room
- Cheer/dance changing room
- Two concession buildings
- Stage
- Sound system
- Lawn seating
- Ten natural grass athletic fields

== Past Events ==
- Fashion Meets Music Festival (2017)
- Annual Obetz Zucchinifest (2017-current)
- Annual Zucchinifest Car Show (2017-current)
- Rugby Ohio State Semi-Finals (2018, 2019)
- Rugby Ohio State Finals (2018, 2019)
- Annual Famous Fortress Fireworks (2017-current)
- Shootout for Soldiers (2018)
- Numerous High School Football match-ups, including the annual Obetz Bowl (2017-current)
- Rugby Ohio Midwest Invitational (2019)
- Annual Obetz Easter Egg Hunt (2018-current)
- Ohio Machine COYLL (Central Ohio Youth Lacrosse League) Tournament (2019)
- Ohio Machine Resolute Tournament (2019)
- USA Ultimate Boys & Girls Ohio High School State Championships (2019)
- Obetz Police vs. Hamilton Township Fire Kickball Match (2019)
- USA Rugby Club National Championships (2019)
- Under Armour All-America Lacrosse Showcase (2019)
- Braxton Miller's 3rd Annual Charg1ng Camp: Columbus Edition (2019)
- AFC Ajax Soccer Camp (2019)
- Greene Speed Academy — Speed & Agility Camp (2019)
- Bands of America Central Ohio Regional Championship (2019-2024)
- Columbus Buddy Walk (2019-Current)
- Fortress Fun Fridays - Concert Series (2019)
- Fortress Obetz served as the home field for the Columbus Pride of the Premier Ultimate League in 2019.
- Annual Obetz Trunk or Treat & Haunted Forest (2019)
- K9 Frisbee Toss & Fetch Worldwide Championship - Ohio Regional (2019)
- Local Police vs. Fire Kickball match (2019)
- Fortress Obetz served as the home field for the Scioto Valley Rugby Club (2018-2019)
- Big Ten Rugby Conference Finals (2019)
- Ohio High School Cross Country State Meet for all divisions (2020-current)
- OHSAA 7th and 8th Grade Cross Country Invitational (2020-current)
- Storm the Fortress 5k and Fun Run (2021-2024)

== Past Events — National Performing Artists ==
- Third Eye Blind
- Bret Michaels
- Scotty McCreery
- Jamey Johnson
- Ted Nugent
- Gretchen Wilson
- DNCE
- Lita Ford
- Fetty Wap
- RaeLynn
- Warrant
- T-Pain
- Tegan and Sara
- Michelle Branch
- St. Lucia
- Lights
- Winger
- Chris Young
