= American Legion Memorial Stadium =

Stadium in Charlotte, North Carolina, USA

Coordinates: 35.2182°N 80.8283°W

- Memorial Stadium
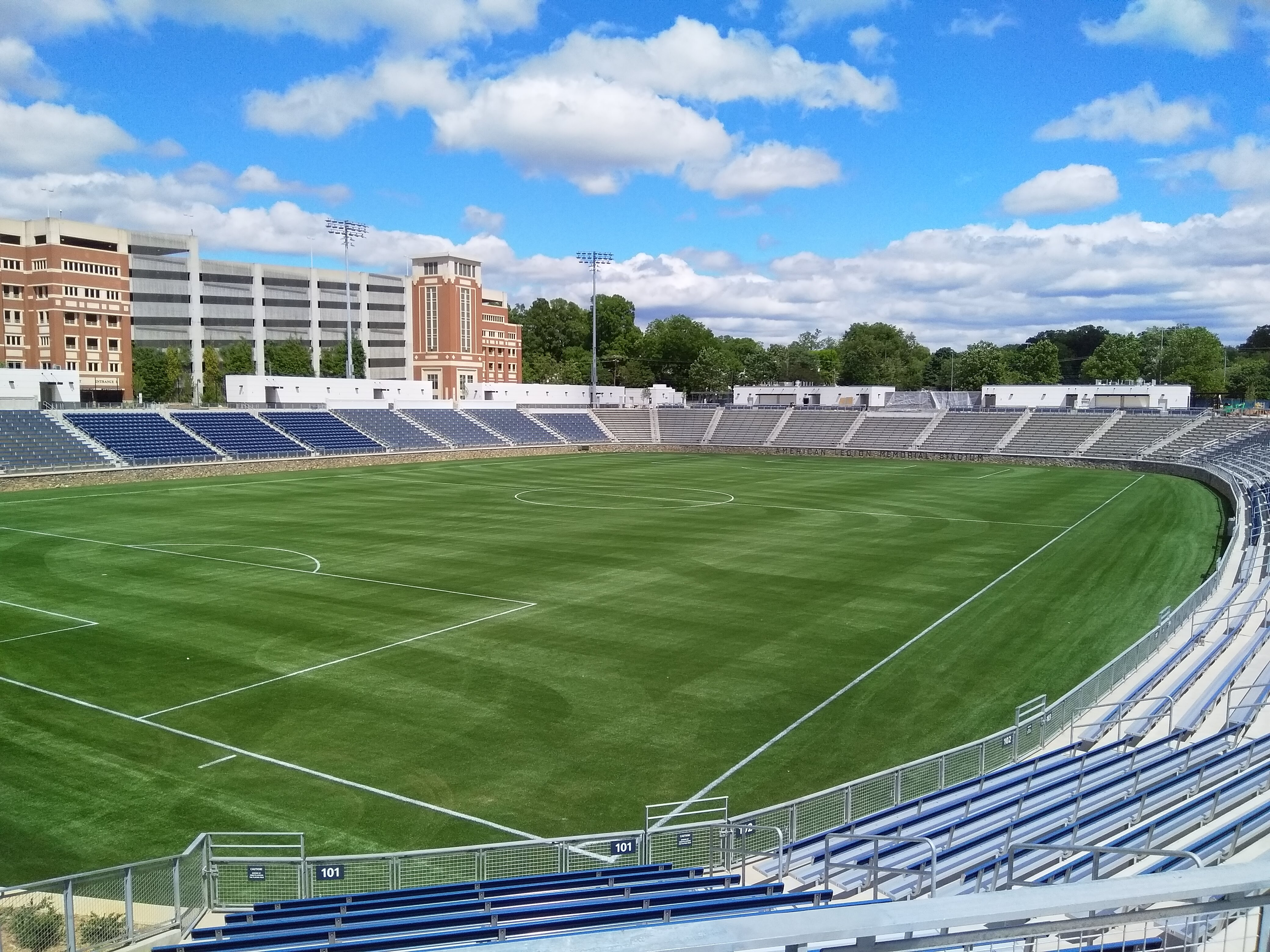
- Interior view of the stadium in 2021
- Interactive map of American Legion Memorial Stadium
- Address: 310 North Kings Drive; Charlotte, North Carolina; United States
- Owner: City of Charlotte
- Operator: Mecklenburg County
- Capacity: 10,500 (2021–present) Former capacity: List: 21,000; 24,000 (?–2009); 16,000 (2009); 17,000 (2010–2019)
- Type: Stadium
- Surface: Pro Sports-Quality Artificial Turf
- Current use: Soccer; Lacrosse; Rugby union
- Public transit: CPCC

Construction
- Groundbreaking: January 1934
- Opened: September 1, 1936; 90 years ago
- Renovated: 2010, 2015, 2019–21
- Closed: 2019–2021
- Reopened: 2021
- Cost: $35 million (2019 renovation)

Tenant
- Current: Charlotte Independence (USL1) (2021–present); Carolina Ascent (USLS) (2024–present); Carolina Chaos (PLL) (2024–present); Former tenants: List: Central High School (NCHSAA) (1936–1959); CC-UNC Owls football (1946–1948); Charlotte Hornets (WFL) (1974–1975); Carolina Lightnin' (ASL) (1981–1984); Myers Park High School (NCHSAA) (2012); Charlotte Hounds (MLL) (2012–2018); JCSU Golden Bulls (NCAA) (some games); Anthem Rugby Carolina (MLR) (2024–2026)

American Legion Memorial Stadium is a 10,500-seat stadium located on 7th Street in the Elizabeth community of Charlotte, North Carolina. It is located on a complex with the Grady Cole Center. Both are located next to Central Piedmont Community College. Independence Park Stadium is also close by. Memorial Stadium is mainly used for high school sporting events and also serves as a public venue. Before the construction of nearby Bank of America Stadium in 1996, Memorial Stadium was Charlotte's largest outdoor stadium, and is still the largest municipal venue in the city.

== History ==
Ground was broken on the stadium in 1934 and the gates were officially opened two years later in 1936. Named in honor of local soldiers who fell in World War I, the stadium was a project of the Works Progress Administration.

Throughout the years the stadium hosted events a variety of events, ranging from Presidential addresses, to professional wrestling shows.

The stadium formerly hosted Charlotte Central High School (which is now called Garinger High School). For many years afterward, as the city grew and opened more high schools, the stadium was used practically every week during the football season to accommodate both schools which had no campus stadium and large crowds which some campus stadiums could not contain for the more popular match-ups.

In February 1985, the stadium hosted a pair of preseason United States Football League (USFL) games, which the city hoped would attract an expansion team. The first game on February 2 saw the New Jersey Generals defeat the Memphis Showboats 16–3, while the Baltimore Stars beat the Tampa Bay Bandits 28–26 on February 16. The Generals–Showboats game drew just 11,667 fans due to rain compared to the approximately 20,000 who attended the Bandits–Stars meeting in sunny weather.

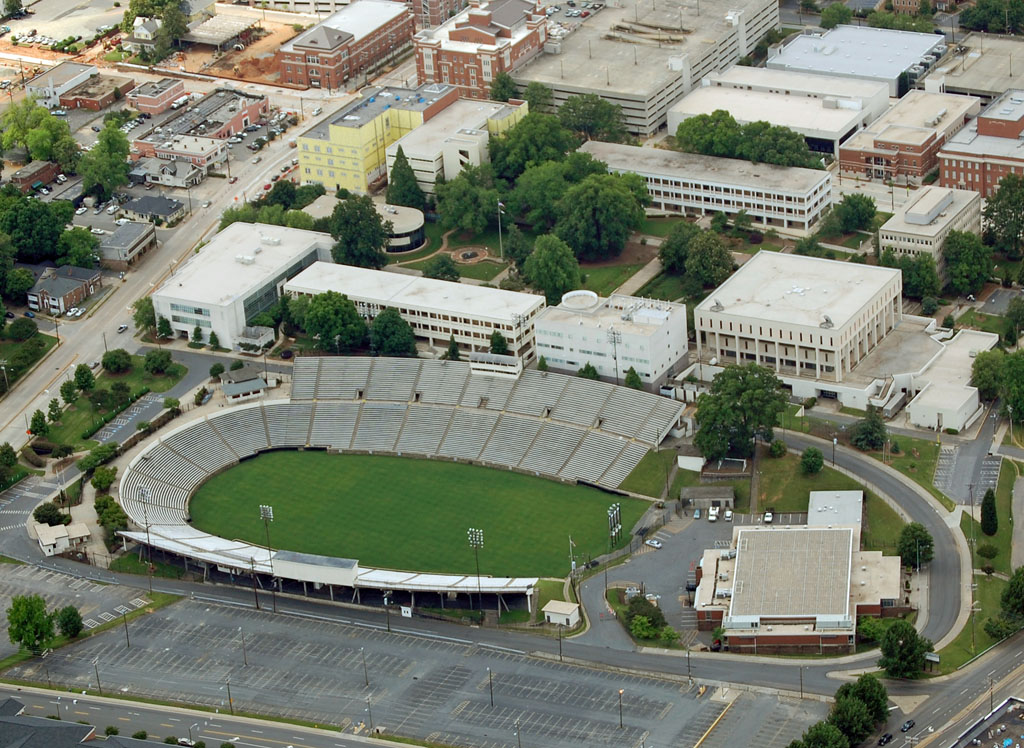
American Legion Memorial Stadium as it looked following renovations in 1970

From 1937 to 2000, the stadium hosted the Shrine Bowl, which was an annual match-up of the top high school football players in North Carolina and South Carolina. Sometime during the 1960s and 1970s, Memorial Stadium gained upper-level seating on both sides of the field, raising its capacity to over 20,000.

On October 4, 1996, the grunge rock band Pearl Jam played a concert at the stadium. During the tour that included this show, the band was determined to find alternative venues, such as this one, primarily as a way to avoid using Ticketmaster as the ticket seller.

For the past few years the stadium has hosted several band competitions. It has hosted the battle of the Bands between the biggest HBCUs in South Carolina, North Carolina, and Georgia, and hosted Drum Corps International competitions hosted by Carolina Crown.

The stadium also served as a neutral site for the 2002 and 2003 meetings between The Citadel and VMI, known as the Military Classic of the South.

=== Recent events ===
In late 2009 the east end of the stadium suffered significant damage after a storm drain under the structure caved in causing the stands above it to collapse. While repairs were being made, the stadium was closed for several months. The stadium reopened in July 2010 with a reduced capacity as a grass berm largely replaced the old seating.

The stadium continues to play a large role in Charlotte-Mecklenburg high school football, as it hosts multiple "kickoff" games during the first week of the season plus occasional big ticket match-ups such as Butler v. Independence and Charlotte Latin v. Charlotte Country Day. The Myers Park Mustangs moved most of their 2012 home games to the stadium after renovations temporarily lowered capacity at Gus Purcell Stadium, their on-campus home.

In early 2015, the possibility arose of renovating the stadium to accommodate professional soccer in Charlotte and try to lure an MLS expansion franchise to the city, however this was only a proposal. Sometime during 2015, a new press box was constructed on the 'visitors' side of the stadium. The Mecklenburg County Commissioners approved a $23 million renovation plan in late 2017.

=== 2019 reconstruction ===
In September 2019, Mecklenburg County Parks and Recreation broke ground on a $31.7 million reconstruction of the stadium, which became the new home of the USL Championship soccer team Charlotte Independence beginning in spring 2021. The reconstruction was completed in 2021. The existing stadium was demolished and re-built. The reconstruction added new concourse buildings, a memorial, a new scoreboard and other amenities. Historical elements of the stadium, such as the stone wall and ticket booths, were removed and preserved offsite, then reinstalled in the new structure. Capacity dropped to 10,500.

In May 2023, USL Super League president Amanda Vandevort announced that Carolina would be one of the league's initial clubs. The women's soccer team will play in American Legion Memorial Stadium starting in August 2024.

== Sports ==
=== Rugby Union ===
Anthem RC joined Major League Rugby for the 2024 Major League Rugby season and played their home matches at American Legion Memorial Stadium. It was announced in March 2025 that American Legion Memorial Stadium would host its first ever international test matches in July 2025, with the USA Eagles hosting Belgium and Spain.

Date	Home	Result	Away	Competition	Attendance	Ref.
July 5, 2025	United States	36–17	Belgium	Test match		
July 12, 2025	United States	20–31	Spain	Test match	6,129	
July 11, 2026	United States	31–15	Zimbabwe	2026 Nations Cup	est. 3,000	

=== Lacrosse ===
The stadium's first professional lacrosse tenant was the Charlotte Hounds of Major League Lacrosse, who began play as an expansion club in 2012. The Hounds experienced mixed levels of success both on the field and at the gate and would pause operations after the 2018 season, planning to resume in 2021 after stadium renovations were finished. This would not happen as the MLL merged with the Premier Lacrosse League in 2020.

Professional lacrosse would return to Memorial Stadium in 2022 with the PLL making Charlotte an annual regular season venue. The league operates as a "touring" format where an entire round of games is held in a different city on a given weekend. The Charlotte round is in early June and combined with multiple large regional youth lacrosse tournaments held around the area that same weekend. PLL member clubs would be assigned nominal "home" cities (each a regular tour stop) in 2024; Chaos LC was accordingly rebranded as the Carolina Chaos and the Charlotte round is now branded as "Chaos Homecoming".

Memorial Stadium also hosts the Atlantic Coast Conference men's lacrosse tournament each year in May, as well as the Queen City Lacrosse Classic each March, a one-day festival with games played by local high school and NCAA Division II men's and women's teams serving as curtain-raisers for an NCAA Division I game for each gender.
