= James M. Shuart Stadium =

New York stadium

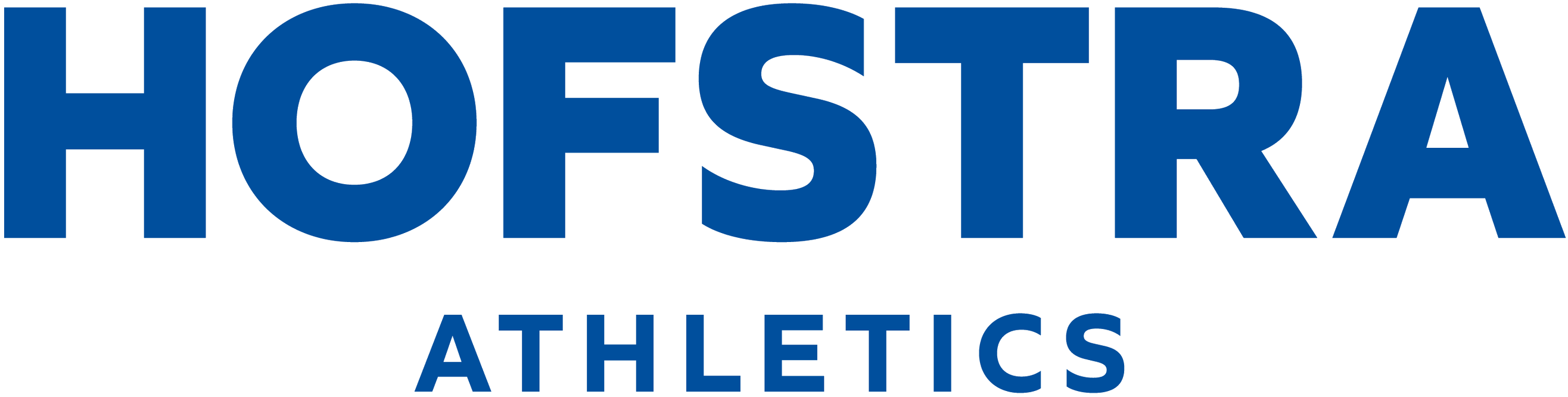
- Interactive map of James M. Shuart Stadium
- Former names: Hofstra Stadium (1963–2002)
- Location: Hempstead, New York
- Coordinates: 40°42′57″N 73°35′47″W
- Owner: Hofstra University
- Operator: Hofstra University Athletics
- Capacity: 11,929
- Surface: FieldTurf (2007–present); AstroTurf (1968–2006); Natural grass (1963–1967)
- Scoreboard: Daktronics FB-2028/MS-2012
- Current use: College lacrosse

Construction
- Built: 1962
- Opened: 1963; 63 years ago
- Renovated: 1996, 2013

Tenant
- List: Current tenants: Hofstra Pride (NCAA) teams: men's and women's lacrosse (1963–present) Premier Lacrosse League (2021–present) New York Atlas (PLL) (2024–;future) USL Long Island (USL1) (2028–future) Former tenants: Hofstra Pride football (1963–2009) Long Island Bulls (ACFL) Football (1969–1970) Long Island Chiefs (ACFL) Football (1973) New York Sentinels (UFL) Football (2009) New York Lizards (MLL) Lacrosse (2001–2002) (2009–2020) New York Cosmos (NASL) Soccer (1972–1973) New York Cosmos (NASL) Soccer (2013–2016) New York Cosmos B (NPSL) Soccer (2015, 2018) Long Island Rough Riders (PDL) Soccer (1994–2008)

Website
- gohofstra.com/james-m-shuart-stadium

The James M. Shuart Stadium is an 11,929-seat multi-purpose stadium and sports facility, the facility serves as the home to Hofstra's lacrosse teams on the campus of Hofstra University in Hempstead, New York. First opened in 1963, and remodeled in 1996 and 2013, it was known as "Hofstra Stadium" until August 29, 2002, when it was renamed after the former president of Hofstra University, who played lacrosse and football during his undergraduate years at the school.

The stadium grounds include James C. Metzger Hall which houses the stadium's press box, luxury suites and the Fried Center for Student-Athlete Development.

== Background ==
Shuart Stadium has held numerous sports and events over the years, including football, lacrosse, and soccer. It has welcomed many teams from different leagues throughout several decades.

== Lacrosse ==
In 1971, the stadium hosted the inaugural NCAA Division I Men's lacrosse championship game. It has also served as the site for two quarterfinal games of the 2009, 2014, 2017, 2018, 2019, 2021 and 2024 tournaments as well as numerous conference championship contests for Women's Lacrosse.

The New York Lizards used the facility as their home field for part of the 2001 season and the full 2002 season. During their first year, they became the inaugural Major League Lacrosse champions. The team returned in 2009 and called the stadium their official home until 2020. After the 2020 season the MLL merged with the Premier Lacrosse League bringing an end to the New York Lizards franchise.

In 2021 the stadium hosted 5 Premier Lacrosse League games over 4 July weekend. Making the stadium a tour site for future PLL events. PLL hosted a weekend of games in 2022 and is the 2023 Semifinals site on September 10.

== Soccer ==
The original New York Cosmos played at the stadium between 1972 and 1973. They won their first NASL Championship at the stadium in 1972. The second-edition Cosmos began playing there in 2013 until 2016, not including the 2016 final, which was instead held at St. John's University's Belmont Stadium. Shuart Stadium also played host to the most recent United States men's match in New York state, when the U.S. hosted Ecuador in a friendly match on November 30, 1984.

Shuart Stadium was also the venue for USL League Two's Long Island Rough Riders, then of professional soccer's A-League.

== Football ==
For nearly five decades, the stadium was home to Hofstra's football team. The team played in the Colonial Athletic Association conference and utilized the stadium from its opening until 2009 when the program was retired.

In 1969, the Westchester Bulls of the Atlantic Coast Football League (ACFL) relocated to Long Island and became the Long Island Bulls, playing their home games at the stadium until 1970. The Long Island Chiefs of the ACFL also played at the stadium in 1973.

In 1983, during the construction of Robert K. Kraft Field at Lawrence A. Wien Stadium, the Columbia Lions used it as a home field for one game.

On November 4, 2009, the New York Sentinels of the United Football League played a home game at the stadium.

The site has hosted both the Long Island All-Star Football Game and the Fun City Bowl, which features the New York City Police and Fire Department teams.

== Other events ==
The facility was used for three nights every October for the annual Newsday Marching Band Festival where selected Long Island high schools performed in an exhibition-style competition. Since 2014, the event has been held elsewhere.

Various Long Island high school and New York state championship games for different sports are also held at the site.

== Design ==
Originally built in 1962 and opened in 1963, the stadium has received a number of upgrades. In 1968 a new artificial playing surface was installed, making the stadium the third college facility in the nation to receive one. A major expansion was completed in the fall of 1996. The capacity had been raised from 7,000 to approximately 13,000, while the Howdy Myers Pavilion and new scoreboards in both end zones were constructed. In 2007, the artificial turf was replaced with FieldTurf which was again replaced in late 2012. Then in 2009 new scoreboards were installed in the north and south end zones. More recently, in 2013, the facility was renovated and reconfigured to its current capacity of 11,929. In late 2013, new lights designed by Musco Lighting replaced the original lights in the stadium that dated back to 1963.
