= 2019 Denver Outlaws season =

Major League Lacrosse season

2019 Denver Outlaws
- League: Major League Lacrosse
- 2019 record: 9-7
- General Manager: Tony Seaman
- Coach: Jon Cohen
- Stadium: Empower Field at Mile High

The 2019 Denver Outlaws season was the fourteenth season for the Outlaws franchise of Major League Lacrosse. It was also the first season under head coach Tony Seaman, who previously served as general manager before B.J. O'Hara took the head coaching job for the New York Lizards. The Denver Outlaws had a very strong team, having 7 players go to the All Star game.

Coming off of a 2018 championship season where the Outlaws again got off to a slow start (1-4) before rattling off a six-game win streak in the regular season and two postseason upsets over the second and top-seeded Chesapeake Bayhawks and Dallas Rattlers, hoisting the Steinfeld Trophy for the third time in five years on August 18 after defeating the Rattlers, 16–12 at MUSC Health Stadium in Charleston, South Carolina, the Outlaws finished with a 9–7 record and returned to the championship game for the fourth consecutive year but would lose to the Chesapeake Bayhawks by the score of 10–9.

With the season starting six weeks later in the calendar year, the Outlaws played their last two home games at Peter Barton Lacrosse Stadium, on the campus of the University of Denver due to conflicting with the NFL season.

== Transactions ==
=== Offseason ===
- March 1 - The Outlaws and goalie Dillon Ward agreed to a one-year contract for 2019.
- May 25 - 44-year-old John Grant Jr. announces he is coming out of retirement to suit up for the Outlaws in 2019. Grant Jr. was serving as the Outlaws' offensive coordinator the past two seasons and will be in a unique role as player-coach. He is currently second on the league's all-time scoring list behind Paul Rabil.

== Collegiate Draft ==
The 2019 Collegiate Draft was held on March 9 in Charlotte, North Carolina at the NASCAR Hall of Fame. Inside Lacrosse gave the Outlaws a "B" in their team-by-team draft grades.

On May 16, the Outlaws announced they had signed Chris Aslanian, Brandon Jones, and Kyle Pless from their draft class. Additionally, they signed rookies they picked up in the dispersal draft in Sean Eccles and Timmy Kelly. The signing of one of their first round picks, Daniel Bucaro, was announced on May 21.

Round	Overall Pick	Player	School	Position	Signed
1	6	Max Tuttle	Sacred Heart	Midfielder	
1	9	Daniel Bucaro	Georgetown	Attack	Yes
2	18	Chris Aslanian	Hobart	Attack	Yes
4	36	Brandon Jones	Air Force	Defense	Yes
5	45	Kyle Marr	Johns Hopkins	Attack	Yes
6	54	Jack Rowlett	North Carolina	Defense	
7	63	Kyle Pless	Rutgers	Defense	Yes

== Schedule ==
Date	Opponent	Stadium	Result	Attendance	Record
May 31	at New York Lizards	James M. Shuart Stadium	W 11-9	5,592	1-0
June 2	at Atlanta Blaze	Grady Stadium	L 12-14	1,523	1-1
June 8	at Atlanta Blaze	Grady Stadium	W 18-16	1,607	2-1
June 27	vs Dallas Rattlers	Sports Authority Field at Mile High	W 15-9	2,134	3-1
June 29	at Boston Cannons	Veterans Memorial Stadium	W 17-16	3,765	4-1
July 4	Chesapeake Bayhawks	Sports Authority Field at Mile High	W 14-13	26,210	5-1
July 11	Atlanta Blaze	Sports Authority Field at Mile High	W 18-17	5,126	6-1
July 21	Dallas Rattlers	Sports Authority Field at Mile High	L 8-11	3,752	6-2
August 3	Boston Cannons	Sports Authority Field at Mile High	L 13-16	2,095	6-3
August 10	at Chesapeake Bayhawks	Navy-Marine Corps Memorial Stadium	L 9-12	4,619	6-4
August 17	at Dallas Rattlers	Ford Center at The Star	L 12-17	4,712	6-5
August 24	New York Lizards	Sports Authority Field at Mile High	W 16-13	3,034	7-5
August 31	Boston Cannons	Peter Barton Lacrosse Stadium	W 22-9	2,112	8-5
September 7	at New York Lizards	James M. Shuart Stadium	W 15-12	4,278	9-5
September 14	Chesapeake Bayhawks	Peter Barton Lacrosse Stadium	L 10-11	2,034	9-6
September 20	at Chesapeake Bayhawks	Navy-Marine Corps Memorial Stadium	L 11-13	16,124	9-7

== Standings ==
2019 Major League Lacrosse Standings
	W	L	PCT	GB	GF	2ptGF	GA	2ptGA
Chesapeake Bayhawks	10	6	.625	-	211	3	186	5
Denver Outlaws	9	7	.563	1	206	15	205	3
Boston Cannons	9	7	.563	1	217	8	211	5
Atlanta Blaze	8	8	.500	2	227	2	228	9
Dallas Rattlers	7	9	.438	3	192	7	202	7
New York Lizards	5	11	.313	5	195	2	216	11

Playoff Seed

== Broadcast ==
The Outlaws announced on June 13 that Altitude Sports would air all remaining Outlaws games (Denver had played three games so far in the season).
