= 2019 Dallas Rattlers season =

2019 Dallas Rattlers
- League: Major League Lacrosse
- 2019 record: 7-9
- General Manager: Bill Warder
- Coach: Bill Warder
- Arena: Ford Center at The Star

The 2019 Dallas Rattlers season was the seventeenth season for the Rattlers franchise of Major League Lacrosse, and second season playing in Frisco, Texas since relocating from Rochester, New York.

The Rattlers finished a league-best 11-3 in 2018, but fell short to the Denver Outlaws in the 2018 Steinfeld Cup, 16-12 in Charleston, South Carolina. It was the Rattlers' second loss in five years to the Outlaws in the championship game, and third overall Steinfeld Cup defeat in five years.

Long-time Rattlers assistant and 2018 Coach of the Year winner Bill Warder returned for his second season as head coach. After starting the season a league-worst 0-7, Warder and the Rattlers orchestrated a six-game win streak (four wins on the road) that had Dallas on the doorstep of the playoff picture. However, two one-goal home losses to New York and Atlanta on August 31 and September 7 officially eliminated the Rattlers. The team finished 2019 with a record of 7-9.

== Transactions ==
=== Offseason ===
- September 18, 2018 - Midfielders Ryan McNamara and Brian Kormondy agree to contract extensions.
- September 21 - The Rattlers signed six players to contract extensions: Christian Carson-Banister, Jordan Dowiak, Chris Keating, Hunter Moreland, Jake Pulver, and Cody Radziewicz.
- October 5 - Attackman Nate Lewnes is acquired from the Ohio Machine in exchange for a conditional draft pick.
- October 15 - Defensive midfielder Joe Gillis is resigned through 2019.
- October 24 - In the first supplemental draft, the Rattlers drafted ten new players in: JD Colarusso, Eli Salama, Blake Boudreau, Jack Trask, Max Gustafson, Zach Rusch, Zach Henkhaus, Danny Fowler, Nick Steinfeld, and Christian Trasolini. The Rattlers also signed undrafted free agents Kris Alleyne, Mike Diener, Wilkins Dismuke, Joe Fiorino, and Ryan Fournier.
- January 21, 2019 - The Rattlers agree to trade attackman Randy Staats back to the Atlanta Blaze in exchange for third and fourth round picks in the 2019 Collegiate Draft.
- April 24 - Following the suspension of the Charlotte Hounds, Florida Launch, and Ohio Machine, the Rattlers pick up eight players in the resulting dispersal draft. This includes Dallas native attackman Bryce Wasserman, who played his rookie season with Ohio in 2018.

=== In-season ===
- July 2 - Midfielder Ryan Keenan is traded to the Chesapeake Bayhawks in exchange for southpaw midfielder Adam Osika.
- July 19 - Shawn Evans (attack) is acquired from the Boston Cannons in exchange for a third round pick in the 2020 Collegiate Draft.
- August 8 - The Rattlers trade a fifth round draft pick in the 2020 Collegiate Draft to the Bayhawks in exchange for faceoff specialist Noah Rak.

== Collegiate Draft ==
The 2019 Collegiate Draft was held on March 9 in Charlotte, North Carolina at the NASCAR Hall of Fame. Inside Lacrosse gave the Rattlers an "A" in their team-by-team draft grades, better than every team except the Chesapeake Bayhawks.

The Rattlers announced the signing of five players on May 21: Craig Chick, Jack Jasinski, Joe Saggese, Lucas Wittenberg, and Landon Kramer.

Round	Overall Pick	Player	School	Position	Signed
1	8	Chris Sabia	Penn State	Defense	No
2	17	Craig Chick	Lehigh	LSM	Yes
3	22	Isaac Paparo	UMass	Midfielder	No
4	31	Teddy Hatfield	Richmond	Attack	Yes
4	35	Jack Jasinski	Ohio State	Midfielder	Yes
5	44	Joe Saggese	Sacred Heart	Attack	Yes
6	48	Lucas Wittenberg	Georgetown	Midfielder	Yes
6	54	Fleet Wallace	Cornell	Defense	No
7	62	Landon Kramer	Sacred Heart	Defense	Yes

== Schedule ==
Date	Opponent	Stadium	Result	Attendance	Record
June 2	Chesapeake Bayhawks	Ford Center at The Star	L 11-14	6,112	0-1
June 9	Boston Cannons	Ford Center at The Star	L 10-16	3,412	0-2
June 21	at Atlanta Blaze	Grady Stadium	L 11-13	2,078	0-3
June 27	at Denver Outlaws	Sports Authority Field at Mile High	L 9-15	2,134	0-4
June 29	at New York Lizards	James M. Shuart Stadium	L 9-13	4,237	0-5
July 7	Boston Cannons	Ford Center at The Star	L 11-15	2,773	0-6
July 14	Chesapeake Bayhawks	Ford Center at The Star	L 11-13	3,102	0-7
July 21	at Denver Outlaws	Sports Authority Field at Mile High	W 11-8	3,752	1-7
August 3	at Atlanta Blaze	Grady Stadium	W 16-14	2,163	2-7
August 10	New York Lizards	Ford Center at The Star	W 15-11	4,011	3-7
August 17	Denver Outlaws	Ford Center at The Star	W 17-12	4,712	4-7
August 24	at Boston Cannons	Veterans Memorial Stadium	W 13-10	4,251	5-7
August 25	at Chesapeake Bayhawks	Navy-Marine Corps Memorial Stadium	W 14-13	6,814	6-7
August 31	New York Lizards	Ford Center at The Star	L 11-12	4,217	6-8
September 7	Atlanta Blaze	Ford Center at The Star	L 14-15	5,146	6-9
September 21	at Boston Cannons	Veterans Memorial Stadium	W 16-15	5,025	7-9

== Standings ==
2019 Major League Lacrosse Standings
	W	L	PCT	GB	GF	2ptGF	GA	2ptGA
Chesapeake Bayhawks	10	6	.625	-	211	3	186	5
Denver Outlaws	9	7	.563	1	206	15	205	3
Boston Cannons	9	7	.563	1	217	8	211	5
Atlanta Blaze	8	8	.500	2	227	2	228	9
Dallas Rattlers	7	9	.438	3	192	7	202	7
New York Lizards	5	11	.313	5	195	2	216	11

Playoff Seed
