= 2020 Boston Cannons season =

The 2020 Boston Cannons Lacrosse season was the 20th season in club history and their last season in the Major League Lacrosse. It would be a successful sendoff, as the Cannons would win the last MLL Championship. They would play their games at Veterans Memorial Stadium (Quincy, Massachusetts).

== Transactions ==
=== Player movement ===
- On February 21, 2020, the Boston Cannons acquire attackman Bryce Wasserman from the Connecticut Hammerheads in exchange for attackman Will Sands.
- On February 21, the Boston Cannons acquire attackman Randy Staats and midfielder Bryan Cole from the Philadelphia Barrage in exchange for long stick midfielder PT Ricci and three picks in the 2020 collegiate draft (one second round, two third round).
- On March 4, the Boston Cannons acquire long stick midfielder Corcoran from the New York Lizards in exchange for attackman Connor O'Hara.
- On March 12, the Boston Cannons acquire long stick midfielder Matt Gilray in exchange for attackman James Burr and a seventh round draft pick in the 2020 collegiate draft

== Regular season ==
The Cannons would win 3 of 5 games, finishing the season at 3-2 and earning the 4th playoff seed.

Date	Opponent	Stadium	Result	Record
June 18	New York Lizards	Navy–Marine Corps Memorial Stadium	W 16-14	1-0
June 20	Chesapeake Bayhawks	Navy–Marine Corps Memorial Stadium	L 12-15	1-1
June 21	Philadelphia Barrage	Navy–Marine Corps Memorial Stadium	W 12-10	2-1
June 23	Connecticut Hammerheads	Navy–Marine Corps Memorial Stadium	L 8-11	2-2
June 24	Denver Outlaws	Navy–Marine Corps Memorial Stadium	W 10-8	3-2

== Playoffs ==
After the #2 and #3 seeded teams were disqualified from playoffs due to players testing positive for covid-19, the Cannons would face the Denver Outlaws in the championship. The Cannons would go on to win the last ever MLL game 13-10.

Date	Opponent	Stadium	Result	Round
July 26	Denver Outlaws	Navy-Marine Corps Memorial Stadium	W 13-10	Championship

== See also ==
- 2020 Major League Lacrosse season
- 2021 Cannons Lacrosse Club season
