= 2019 Atlanta Blaze season =

2019 Atlanta Blaze
- League: Major League Lacrosse
- 2019 record: 8-8
- General Manager: Spencer Ford
- Coach: Liam Banks
- Stadium: Grady Stadium; Atlanta Silverbacks Park

The 2019 Atlanta Blaze season was the fourth season for the Atlanta Blaze of Major League Lacrosse. Liam Banks entered his second season as head coach, after leading the Blaze to their best record in franchise history (7–7) in 2018. It was the team's first year at Grady Stadium in downtown Atlanta, after spending its first three years at Fifth Third Bank Stadium in Kennesaw.

On July 28, due to maintenance at Grady Stadium, the Blaze announced they would be playing their last three home games at Atlanta Silverbacks Park

On September 7, the Blaze secured their first playoff berth with a 15–14 win over the Dallas Rattlers. It also gave them a franchise-best eighth win of the season.

== Transactions ==
=== Offseason ===
- September 21, 2018 - The Blaze announced the signing of a core group of players: Tommy Palasek, Liam Byrnes, Justin Pennington, and Chris Madalon.
- January 21, 2019 - Attackman Randy Staats was reacquired in a deal with the Dallas Rattlers. In exchange, the Blaze sent their third and fourth round picks in the 2019 Collegiate Draft to the Rattlers.

== Collegiate Draft ==
The 2019 Collegiate Draft was held on March 9 in Charlotte, North Carolina at the NASCAR Hall of Fame. Inside Lacrosse gave the Blaze a "C" in their team-by-team draft grades.

The Blaze began their rookie signings with a bang on May 15 with the announcement that #1 overall draft pick (who they acquired when the Ohio Machine folded in April) Alex Woodall, face-off specialist from Towson had chosen the Blaze over Whipsnakes Lacrosse Club and the Premier Lacrosse League.

The next day, the Blaze announced four of their top six draft picks, Brendan Sunday, Dylan Gaines, Colton Jackson, and Eddie Bouhall had agreed to contracts. This group joined other rookies TJ Comizio, Brett Craig, and Jack Mangan.

Round	Overall Pick	Player	School	Position	Signed
2	13	Brendan Sunday	Towson	Attack	Yes
2	14	Dylan Gaines	Denver	Defense	Yes
3	26	Colton Jackson	Denver	Midfielder	Yes
5	39	Brett Craig	Seton Hill	LSM	Yes
5	41	Tyson Gibson	Robert Morris	Midfielder	
6	49	Eddie Bouhall	Lehigh	Defense	Yes
7	58	Jake McCulloch	Cornell	Midfielder	

== Schedule ==
=== Regular season ===
Date	Opponent	Stadium	Result	Attendance	Record
June 2	Denver Outlaws	Grady Stadium	W 14-12	1,523	1-0
June 8	Denver Outlaws	Grady Stadium	L 16-18	1,607	1-1
June 21	Dallas Rattlers	Grady Stadium	W 13-11	2,078	2-1
June 29	at Chesapeake Bayhawks	Navy-Marine Corps Memorial Stadium	W 19-10	7,128	3-1
July 6	at Chesapeake Bayhawks	Navy-Marine Corps Memorial Stadium	L 13-16	5,200	3-2
July 7	New York Lizards	Grady Stadium	W 12-11	1,927	4-2
July 11	at Denver Outlaws	Sports Authority Field at Mile High	L 17-18	5,126	4-3
July 13	Boston Cannons	Grady Stadium	L 16-17	1,333	4-4
July 20	at Boston Cannons	Veterans Memorial Stadium	W 15-12	4,083	5-4
August 3	Dallas Rattlers	Atlanta Silverbacks Park	L 14-16	2,163	5-5
August 10	at Boston Cannons	Veterans Memorial Stadium	W 14-13	3,726	6-5
August 17	at New York Lizards	James M. Shuart Stadium	W 14-13 (OT)	4,119	7-5
August 24	Chesapeake Bayhawks	Atlanta Silverbacks Park	L 13-16	1,548	7-6
September 7	at Dallas Rattlers	Ford Center at The Star	W 15-14	5,146	8-6
September 14	Boston Cannons	Atlanta Silverbacks Park	L 9-19	1,737	8-7
September 21	at New York Lizards	James M. Shuart Stadium	L 15-21	5,747	8-8

== Standings ==
2019 Major League Lacrosse Standings
	W	L	PCT	GB	GF	2ptGF	GA	2ptGA
Chesapeake Bayhawks	10	6	.625	-	211	3	186	5
Denver Outlaws	9	7	.563	1	206	15	205	3
Boston Cannons	9	7	.563	1	217	8	211	5
Atlanta Blaze	8	8	.500	2	227	2	228	9
Dallas Rattlers	7	9	.438	3	192	7	202	7
New York Lizards	5	11	.313	5	195	2	216	11

Playoff Seed
