= 2019 Chesapeake Bayhawks season =

Major League Lacrosse season

2019 Chesapeake Bayhawks
- League: Major League Lacrosse
- 2019 record: 10-6
- General Manager: Dave Cottle
- Coach: Dave Cottle
- Arena: Navy-Marine Corps Memorial Stadium

The 2019 Chesapeake Bayhawks season was the last season for the Bayhawks franchise of Major League Lacrosse, and tenth season using the 'Chesapeake' Bayhawks moniker. It is Dave Cottle's second season of his second tenure as head coach of the team. In 2018, Cottle led the Bayhawks to their first playoff appearance in five years.

The Bayhawks wanted to look to get back to the postseason again, after posting a 9-5 record in 2018, a season that ended in disappointment after a 13-12 home semifinal loss to the eventual champion Denver Outlaws.

== Transactions ==
=== Offseason ===
- October 2018 - The Bayhawks select 15 players in the league's first supplemental draft, including five Ohio State Buckeyes.
- March 13, 2019 - The Bayhawks resign attackman Steele Stanwick to a one-year contract extension.
- March 24 - 12 players are added to the preseason roster following the league's dispersal draft. The most notable addition was Nick Mariano. Nick formerly played under his brother Tom, who was the head coach for the Florida Launch before league contraction. Tom, who led the Launch to the franchise's only postseason appearance in 2017, was announced as an assistant coach for the Bayhawks just a day before.

=== In-season ===
- July 2 - The Bayhawks trade midfielder Adam Osika to the Dallas Rattlers in exchange for Ryan Keenan.
- July 11 - Faceoff specialist Noah Rak is acquired from the New York Lizards in exchange for defenseman Matt Borges and a fifth round draft pick in the 2020 collegiate draft.
- August 7 - Recently-acquired Noah Rak is traded to the Rattlers in exchange for a fifth round draft pick in the upcoming collegiate draft.

== Collegiate Draft ==
The 2019 Collegiate Draft was held on March 9 in Charlotte, North Carolina at the NASCAR Hall of Fame. Inside Lacrosse gave the Bayhawks an "A+" in their team-by-team draft grades, the only team receiving such high marks. One reason was for drafting likely Tewaaraton Award winner Pat Spencer from Loyola.

Round	Overall Pick	Player	School	Position
1	7	Pat Spencer	Loyola	Attack
2	16	Greyson Torain	Navy	Midfielder
3	20	Curtis Corley	Maryland	Defense
3	25	Noah Richard	Marquette	LSM
5	43	Austin French	Denver	Attack
6	52	Warren Jeffrey	Vermont	Defense
7	61	John Prendergast	Duke	Defense

== Schedule ==
Date	Opponent	Stadium	Result	Attendance	Record
June 2	at Dallas Rattlers	Ford Center at The Star	W 14-11	6,112	1-0
June 15	at New York Lizards	James M. Shuart Stadium	W 16-14	2,723	2-0
June 29	Atlanta Blaze	Navy-Marine Corps Memorial Stadium	L 10-19	7,128	2-1
July 4	at Denver Outlaws	Sports Authority Field at Mile High	L 13-14	26,210	2-2
June 6	Atlanta Blaze	Navy-Marine Corps Memorial Stadium	W 16-13	5,200	3-2
July 14	at Dallas Rattlers	Ford Center at The Star	W 13-11	3,102	4-2
July 20	New York Lizards	Navy-Marine Corps Memorial Stadium	L 10-14	5,422	4-3
August 3	New York Lizards	Navy-Marine Corps Memorial Stadium	W 11-9	4,234	5-3
August 4	at New York Lizards	James M. Shuart Stadium	W 24-7	5,012	6-3
August 10	Denver Outlaws	Navy-Marine Corps Memorial Stadium	W 12-9	4,619	7-3
August 17	Boston Cannons	Navy-Marine Corps Memorial Stadium	L 11-12 (OT)	7,624	7-4
August 24	at Atlanta Blaze	Grady Stadium	W 16-13	1,548	8-4
August 25	Dallas Rattlers	Navy-Marine Corps Memorial Stadium	L 13-14	6,814	8-5
September 7	at Boston Cannons	Veterans Memorial Stadium	L 11-12	3,200	8-6
September 14	at Denver Outlaws	Peter Barton Lacrosse Stadium	W 11-10	2,034	9-6
September 20	Denver Outlaws	Navy-Marine Corps Memorial Stadium	W 13-11	16,124	10-6

== Standings ==
2019 Major League Lacrosse Standings
	W	L	PCT	GB	GF	2ptGF	GA	2ptGA
Chesapeake Bayhawks	10	6	.625	-	211	3	186	5
Denver Outlaws	9	7	.563	1	206	15	205	3
Boston Cannons	9	7	.563	1	217	8	211	5
Atlanta Blaze	8	8	.500	2	227	2	228	9
Dallas Rattlers	7	9	.438	3	192	7	202	7
New York Lizards	5	11	.313	5	195	2	216	11

Playoff Seed
