= 2019 New York Lizards season =

Major League Lacrosse.season

2019 New York Lizards
- League: Major League Lacrosse
- 2019 record: 5–11
- General Manager: Joe Spallina
- Coach: B.J. O'Hara
- Arena: James M. Shuart Stadium

The 2019 New York Lizards season is the nineteenth season for the Lizards franchise of Major League Lacrosse. The Lizards are coming off an 8–6 season in which they finished fourth place in the league standings and grabbed the last playoff spot. The team ultimately lost to their former in-state rival and now Dallas Rattlers, 15–12 in the semifinals.

The Lizards, like most teams in the league, would have to rebuild from a max exodus of players to the new Premier Lacrosse League, a new professional league founded by former Lizard and MLL star Paul Rabil. The Lizards would end up finishing last place in the league standings at 5–11, their worst record since going 4–10 in 2013. It was the first season for the Lizards under the reigns of B.J. O'Hara, four-time Steinfeld Cup-winning coach. O'Hara replaced Joe Spallina officially on December 19, 2018, after Spallina decided to step back into a front office role.

== Transactions ==
=== Offseason ===
- April 24, 2019 - Midfielder Kevin Crowley and goalie Austin Kaut headline a group of nine players selected by the Lizards in the relocation draft, which was held due to the suspension of the Charlotte Hounds, and folding of the Florida Launch and Ohio Machine.
- May 7 - Top overall draft pick (2017) and Long Island native Dylan Molloy signs with the Lizards after two years with the Florida Launch and being cut by the Redwoods Lacrosse Club of the PLL.

=== In-season ===
- July 11 - The Lizards trade faceoff specialist Noah Rak to the Chesapeake Bayhawks in exchange for defenseman Matt Borges and a fifth round pick in the 2020 Collegiate Draft.

== Collegiate Draft ==
The 2019 Collegiate Draft was held on March 9 in Charlotte, North Carolina at the NASCAR Hall of Fame. Inside Lacrosse gave the Lizards a "B−" in their team-by-team draft grades, despite being limited to only six picks.

Round	Overall Pick	Player	School	Position
3	24	Jack Tigh	Yale	Midfielder
4	33	John Daniggelis	Yale	Midfielder
5	42	Connor Farrell	LIU Post	Faceoff
6	51	Dan Dolan	Maryland	Goalie
7	57	Decker Curran	Michigan	Midfielder
7	60	Brendan Kearns	Providence Friars	Attack

== Schedule ==
Date	Opponent	Stadium	Result	Attendance	Record
May 31	Denver Outlaws	James M. Shuart Stadium	L 9–11	5,592	0–1
June 1	at Boston Cannons	Veterans Memorial Stadium	L 12–13	5,025	0–2
June 15	Chesapeake Bayhawks	James M. Shuart Stadium	L 14–16	2,723	0–3
June 22	at Boston Cannons	Veterans Memorial Stadium	L 11–18	3,621	0–4
June 29	Dallas Rattlers	James M. Shuart Stadium	W 13–9	4,237	1–4
July 7	at Atlanta Blaze	Grady Stadium	L 11–12	1,927	1–5
July 11	Boston Cannons	James M. Shuart Stadium	W 15–12	4,716	2–5
July 20	at Chesapeake Bayhawks	Navy-Marine Corps Memorial Stadium	W 14–10	5,422	3–5
August 3	at Chesapeake Bayhawks	Navy-Marine Corps Memorial Stadium	L 9–11	4,234	3–6
August 4	Chesapeake Bayhawks	James M. Shuart Stadium	L 7–24	5,012	3–7
August 10	at Dallas Rattlers	Ford Center at The Star	L 11–15	4,011	3–8
August 17	Atlanta Blaze	James M. Shuart Stadium	L 13–14 (OT)	4,119	3–9
August 24	at Denver Outlaws	Sports Authority Field at Mile High	L 13–16	3,034	3–10
August 31	at Dallas Rattlers	Ford Center at The Star	W 12–11	4,217	4–10
September 7	Denver Outlaws	James M. Shuart Stadium	L 12–15	4,278	4–11
September 21	Atlanta Blaze	James M. Shuart Stadium	W 21–15	5,747	5–11

== Standings ==
2019 Major League Lacrosse Standings
	W	L	PCT	GB	GF	2ptGF	GA	2ptGA
Chesapeake Bayhawks	10	6	.625	-	211	3	186	5
Denver Outlaws	9	7	.563	1	206	15	205	3
Boston Cannons	9	7	.563	1	217	8	211	5
Atlanta Blaze	8	8	.500	2	227	2	228	9
Dallas Rattlers	7	9	.438	3	192	7	202	7
New York Lizards	5	11	.313	5	195	2	216	11

Playoff Seed
