= 2019 Major League Lacrosse season =

19th season of Major League Lacrosse

2019 MLL season
- League: Major League Lacrosse
- Sport: Field lacrosse
- Duration: May 31 – October 6, 2019
- Teams: 6

Draft
- Top draft pick: Alex Woodall
- Picked by: Ohio Machine

Regular season
- Season MVP: Lyle Thompson (Chesapeake Bayhawks)
- Top scorer: Lyle Thompson (Chesapeake Bayhawks)

Playoffs
- Finals champions: Chesapeake Bayhawks
- Runners-up: Denver Outlaws
- Finals MVP: Steele Stanwick (Bayhawks)

MLL seasons
- ← 2018 season 2020 season →

The 2019 Major League Lacrosse season was the 19th season of Major League Lacrosse. The regular season began on Friday, May 31 and ended on Sunday, September 22. It was the first time the league would ever begin its season after Memorial Day, allowing all players selected in the collegiate draft to play a full season. 2019 also marks the first time each team would play 16 games. The league has played a 14-game schedule since 2012. Additionally, the league returned to a Championship Weekend format instead of a two-week postseason for the first time since 2013. Championship Weekend was hosted in Denver with two semifinal games on Friday, October 4 and the 19th Steinfeld Cup was hosted at Dick's Sporting Goods Park October 6 on ESPN2.

For the third time in five years, the Denver Outlaws enter the season as defending Steinfeld Cup champions. They defeated the Dallas Rattlers 16–12 in the 2018 championship game in Charleston, South Carolina.

On April 1, the league announced that the Charlotte Hounds, Florida Launch, and Ohio Machine would not be participating in the 2019 season, with Charlotte set to return in 2021 and Florida and Ohio folding. An updated league schedule was released April 3. The league competed with only six teams, the fewest since 2011.

== Milestones and events ==
- September 17, 2018 - The league announces a 51% increase in the gameday salary cap, an expansion of the schedule from 14 to 16 games, and expansion of the game day active roster from 19 to 20 players.
- October 1 - The league announces a shift in the season, stating the league will begin the 2019 season on Friday, May 31, the weekend after Memorial Day and the NCAA Lacrosse championships.
- October 18 - The league announces plans for a total rebranding effort. The most noticeable changes will be a new logo, replacing one that has been around since the league's inaugural season. MLL also announced with the rebranding, its official website (along with each team's website) will be overhauled. On November 14, MLL announced it had selected Troika to lead that process.
- November 29 - The 2019 schedule is released, highlighted by 58 weekend games compared to only 14 weekday games. With the schedule release, the league also stated it will continue its partnership with ESPN in 2019. An updated schedule reflecting league contraction was released April 3.
- May 16, 2019 - Progressive Insurance is announced as the league's official insurance provider.
- May 25 - 44-year-old John Grant Jr., the second-all time leading scorer in MLL history and Denver Outlaws offensive coordinator announces he will come out of retirement and suit up for the Outlaws in 2019. Grant Jr., who last played in 2017 as a member of the Machine, will serve a unique role as a player-coach.
- June 8 - John Grant Jr. surpasses Paul Rabil's points record (regular season and playoff) of 596 and reclaims his title as the league's all-time leading scorer.
- July 15 - Denver is announced as the host city for the 2019 Championship Weekend. Peter Barton Stadium will host the two semifinal games on October 4 and Dick's Sporting Goods Park (home to MLS's Colorado Rapids), will host the 19th Steinfeld Cup on Sunday, October 6.
- July 28 - Due to maintenance beginning at Grady Stadium, the Blaze announce they will play their last three home games at Atlanta Silverbacks Park in North Atlanta.
- August 24 - John Grant Jr. becomes the all-time regular season points leader on a seven-point night propelling the Outlaws to a 16-13 win over New York, snapping a four-game losing streak.

=== Stadium changes ===
- Florida Launch - With the schedule release on November 29, the Launch announced they would move their home games to Central Broward Regional Park in Lauderhill, due to the later season date overlapping with the Florida Atlantic Owls football season. The Launch had spent all five years of their franchise's history at FAU Stadium. However, on April 1, the Launch were announced as one of the three teams being suspended under league contraction.
- Boston Cannons - The Cannons announced on December 4 that they would be moving their home games to Veterans Memorial Stadium in Quincy. The team will also invest in making significant upgrades to the facility, which was built during The Great Depression.
- Atlanta Blaze - On March 29, the Blaze announced they were relocating to Midtown Atlanta and 6,500-seat Grady Stadium. They spent their first three years of existence at Fifth Third Bank Stadium. However on July 28, the Blaze were forced to move again due to Atlanta Silverbacks Park due to maintenance at Grady Stadium.

=== Coaching changes ===
- New York Lizards - B.J. O'Hara was announced the Lizards' new head coach after Joe Spallina transitioned himself into a front office role. O'Hara had been serving as the head coach of the Denver Outlaws, who have won three of the past five Steinfeld Cup games.
- Denver Outlaws - At the same time the Lizards announced O'Hara as their head coach, the Outlaws named Tony Seaman their sixth head coach. Seaman had served as the Outlaws' general manager from 2012 to 2018.
- Charlotte Hounds - Former player Joe Cummings was announced as the Hounds' third head coach on January 16. Cummings replaces Jim Stagnitta, who stepped away from the Charlotte Hounds after three years on October 25. Stagnitta was the franchise's all-time leader in wins (21) and led the team to its first and only winning season in 2016. However, the Hounds were one of teams affected by league contraction on April 1.

== Broadcast ==
Along with the league's schedule release on November 29, 2018, MLL announced it will continue its partnership with ESPN and Lax Sports Network for the 2019 season. ESPN+ will broadcast a Game of the Week. The All Star Game in Annapolis will be broadcast on ESPN2 while the 2019 Steinfeld Cup will be broadcast on ESPNEWS.

On May 30, the league announced that 12 games and a weekly studio show would be broadcast on Stadium.

On June 14, the league announced a partnership expansion with ESPN, as ESPN Player will broadcast 18 games on an international streaming platform.

== Teams ==
| Atlanta Blaze | Boston Cannons | Chesapeake Bayhawks |
|---|---|---|
| Atlanta Silverbacks Park | Veterans Memorial Stadium | Navy–Marine Corps Memorial Stadium |
| Capacity: 5,000 | Capacity: 5,000 | Capacity: 34,000 |

Locations of teams for the 2019 MLL season

| Dallas Rattlers | Denver Outlaws | New York Lizards |
|---|---|---|
| The Ford Center at The Star | Empower Field at Mile High | James M. Shuart Stadium |
| Capacity: 12,000 | Capacity: 76,125 | Capacity: 11,929 |

== Standings ==
2019 Major League Lacrosse Standings
| | W | L | PCT | GB | GF | 2ptGF | GA | 2ptGA |
|---|---|---|---|---|---|---|---|---|
| Chesapeake Bayhawks | 10 | 6 | .625 | - | 211 | 3 | 186 | 5 |
| Denver Outlaws | 9 | 7 | .563 | 1 | 206 | 15 | 205 | 3 |
| Boston Cannons | 9 | 7 | .563 | 1 | 217 | 8 | 211 | 5 |
| Atlanta Blaze | 8 | 8 | .500 | 2 | 227 | 2 | 228 | 9 |
| Dallas Rattlers | 7 | 9 | .438 | 3 | 192 | 7 | 202 | 7 |
| New York Lizards | 5 | 11 | .313 | 5 | 195 | 2 | 216 | 11 |

Playoff Seed

== Attendance ==
For the first time since 2011, the league's average attendance per game would see an increase. Half of the six teams would see a boost in attendance, although the Denver Outlaws would record their worst attendance in team history. The Chesapeake Bayhawks would become the first attendance champion not named the Denver Outlaws since the Boston Cannons in 2012, and would draw 16,124 for their last regular season game on September 21. The Boston Cannons saw a 9% growth and announced two sellouts at their new home in Quincy, Massachusetts. The Atlanta Blaze, despite having to change stadiums midseason, would see a slight growth in attendance for the first time in their young history.

| Team | Total | Average | Change |
|---|---|---|---|
| Chesapeake | 57,165 | 7,145 | 71% |
| Denver | 46,497 | 5,812 | -25% |
| New York | 36,424 | 4,553 | -3% |
| Dallas | 33,485 | 4,185 | -12% |
| Boston | 32,696 | 4,087 | 9% |
| Atlanta | 13,916 | 1,739 | 4% |
| League | 220,183 | 4,587 | 25% |

== Collegiate Draft ==
The league hosted its collegiate draft on Saturday, March 9 in Charlotte at the NASCAR Hall of Fame. This was announced on January 23. Faceoff specialist Alex Woodall from Towson was drafted first overall by the Machine. The Chesapeake Bayhawks drafted one of the biggest names in college lacrosse, Pat Spencer with the seventh pick.

=== Rookie selection draft ===
With the league contracting to six teams almost a month after the collegiate draft, questions were raised about what would happen to the players selected in the draft by Charlotte, Florida, and Ohio. On April 26, the league's remaining six teams held a dispersal draft for those collegiate athletes selected by the three suspended teams and any other eligible NCAA seniors. Top pick Alex Woodall (selected by Ohio) was picked up by the Blaze.

== Dispersal draft ==
The league held a dispersal draft on April 24 to accommodate for the rosters of the three teams who suspended operations earlier in the month. Notable player movement included Ben Williams (faceoff/defense) going to Atlanta, midfielder Nick Mariano signing with the Chesapeake Bayhawks, veteran midfielder Kevin Crowley and goalie Austin Kaut signing with the New York Lizards, and Dallas native attackman Bryce Wasserman going home to the Rattlers.

== All Star Game ==
The 2019 All Star Game took place on Saturday, July 27 at Navy-Marine Corps Memorial Stadium in Annapolis, Maryland, home to the Chesapeake Bayhawks. It was broadcast on ESPN2. The 19th edition of the game the players were voted into the contest by MLL fans and then drafted into teams called Fire and Ice. Team captains were Rob Pannell with B.J. O'Hara as the coach (Fire) and Lyle Thompson with Bill Warder as the coach (Ice). Team Ice won by a sudden victory overtime goal by 21-year-old rookie Brendan Sunday 16–15. Even though Team Fire was defeated, Dylan Molloy of Fire earned the MVP honors with a check for $10,000 from sponsor New Balance. Molloy had 5 goals, 1 assist and 6 points.

== Playoffs ==
For the first time since 2013, the playoffs will have a Final Four format, with two semifinal games on Friday, October 4 and the championship game on Sunday, October 6. Four teams will make the postseason bracket. On July 15, Denver was announced as the host city. Peter Barton Stadium will host the two semifinal games and Dick's Sporting Goods Park will host the 19th Steinfeld Cup.

Semifinals; October 4 Peter Barton Stadium
1 | Chesapeake (OT) | 14
4 | Atlanta | 13
2 | Denver | 17
3 | Boston | 15

Championship; October 6 Dick's Sporting Goods Park
1 | Chesapeake | 10
2 | Denver | 9
