= 2019 Boston Cannons season =

2019 Boston Cannons
- League: Major League Lacrosse
- 2019 record: 9–7
- General Manager: Sean Quirk
- Coach: Sean Quirk
- Stadium: Veterans Memorial Stadium

The 2019 Boston Cannons season will be the nineteenth season for the Boston Cannons of Major League Lacrosse. Sean Quirk enters his fourth season as head coach, after leading the team to a 5-9 record in 2018, which was a two-win improvement from 2017. 2019 will be the team's first summer at Veterans Memorial Stadium in Quincy after most recently playing at Harvard Stadium. With this move, the team will invest $1.5 million in stadium expansion and improvements, bringing capacity up to 5,000.

== Transactions ==
=== Offseason ===
- February 15, 2019 - The Cannons ship face-off specialist Nathan Farrell and the 39th overall pick of the 2019 collegiate draft to the Atlanta Blaze in exchange for defenseman James Leary.
- March 21 - Two players, midfielder Jay Drapeau and defenseman Bill O'Brien, are selected in the second supplemental draft.
- March 25 - The Cannons sign free agent long stick midfielders Drew Bourdeau and Jimmy Cunningham.

== In-season ==
- July 19 - The Cannons trade attackman Shawn Evans to the Dallas Rattlers in exchange for a third round draft pick in the 2020 collegiate draft.

== Collegiate Draft ==
The 2019 Collegiate Draft was held on March 9 in Charlotte, North Carolina at the NASCAR Hall of Fame. Inside Lacrosse gave the Cannons a "C−" in their team-by-team draft grades, the lowest mark received by any team.

Top draft selection and third overall pick Zach Goodrich officially signed with the Cannons on May 19. Goodrich chose the Cannons over Chrome Lacrosse Club of the Premier Lacrosse League, who also selected Goodrich third in their respective draft.

Round	Overall Pick	Player	School	Position
1	3	Zach Goodrich	Towson	Midfield
1	4	Austin Henningsen	Maryland	Faceoff
2	12	Clarke Petterson	Cornell	Attack
3	21	Nick DeCaprio	Michigan	LSM
3	27	Ryland Reese	Stony Brook	LSM
4	30	Brent Noseworthy	Michigan	Attack
4	34	Tyson Bomberry	Syracuse	Defense
7	55	James Burr	Boston University	Attack

== Schedule ==
=== Regular season ===
Date	Opponent	Stadium	Result	Attendance	Record
June 1	New York Lizards	Veterans Memorial Stadium	W 13-12	5,025	1-0
June 9	at Dallas Rattlers	Ford Center at The Star	W 16-10	3,412	2-0
June 22	New York Lizards	Veterans Memorial Stadium	W 18-11	3,621	3-0
June 29	Denver Outlaws	Veterans Memorial Stadium	L 16-17	3,765	3-1
July 7	at Dallas Rattlers	Ford Center at The Star	W 15-11	2,773	4-1
July 11	at New York Lizards	James M. Shuart Stadium	L 12-15	4,716	4-2
July 13	at Atlanta Blaze	Grady Stadium	W 17-16	1,333	5-2
July 20	Atlanta Blaze	Veterans Memorial Stadium	L 12-15	4,083	5-3
August 3	at Denver Outlaws	Sports Authority Field at Mile High	W 16-13	2,095	6-3
August 10	Atlanta Blaze	Veterans Memorial Stadium	L 13-14	3,726	6-4
August 17	at Chesapeake Bayhawks	Navy-Marine Corps Memorial Stadium	W 12-11 (OT)	7,624	7-4
August 24	Dallas Rattlers	Veterans Memorial Stadium	L 10-13	4,251	7-5
August 31	at Denver Outlaws	Peter Barton Lacrosse Stadium	L 9-22	2,112	7-6
September 7	Chesapeake Bayhawks	Veterans Memorial Stadium	W 12-11	3,200	8-6
September 14	at Atlanta Blaze	Grady Stadium	W 19-9	1,737	9-6
September 21	Dallas Rattlers	Veterans Memorial Stadium	L 9-27	5,025	9-7

== Broadcast ==
On March 28, the Cannons announced that all 16 regular season games will be broadcast on NBC Sports Boston, 11 of them being produced live.

== Standings ==
2019 Major League Lacrosse Standings
	W	L	PCT	GB	GF	2ptGF	GA	2ptGA
Chesapeake Bayhawks	10	6	.625	-	211	3	186	5
Denver Outlaws	9	7	.563	1	206	15	205	3
Boston Cannons	9	7	.563	1	217	8	211	5
Atlanta Blaze	8	8	.500	2	227	2	228	9
Dallas Rattlers	7	9	.438	3	192	7	202	7
New York Lizards	5	11	.313	5	195	2	216	11

Playoff Seed
