= 2020 New York Lizards season =

2020 New York Lizards
- League: Major League Lacrosse
- 2020 record: 0-5
- General Manager: Joe Spallina
- Coach: B.J. O'Hara
- Arena: James M. Shuart Stadium

The 2020 New York Lizards season was the 20th and final season for the Lizards in Major League Lacrosse. The Lizards were coming off of a 5-11 record in the 2019 season in which they missed the playoffs, where they finished in last place in the standings. However, the Lizards would finish with an 0-5 record, becoming the second team in MLL history to finish a season winless, joining the 2006 Chicago Machine where they went 0-12.

== Shortened season ==
Originally slated to play a ten-game regular season that was originally scheduled to begin play on May 30, Major League Lacrosse suspended the season until July 18 due to the COVID-19 pandemic. The season was then rescheduled as a five–game regular season with all games including the postseason being played at Navy–Marine Corps Memorial Stadium, home of the Chesapeake Bayhawks.

== Schedule ==
Date	Opponent	Stadium	Result	Attendance (Note: Due to the COVID-19 pandemic, the league did not allow any fans to attend games during the shortened season.)	Record
July 18	at Boston Cannons	Navy–Marine Corps Memorial Stadium	L 14-16	0	0-1
July 19	Chesapeake Bayhawks	Navy–Marine Corps Memorial Stadium	L 13-15	0	0-2
July 21	Denver Outlaws	Navy–Marine Corps Memorial Stadium	L 11-12	0	0-3
July 22	Connecticut Hammerheads	Navy–Marine Corps Memorial Stadium	L 8-10	0	0-4
July 23	at Philadelphia Barrage	Navy–Marine Corps Memorial Stadium	L 11-12	0	0-5

== Standings ==
2020 Major League Lacrosse Standings
	W	L	PCT	GB	GF	2ptGF	GA	2ptGA
Denver Outlaws	4	1	.800	-	66	0	48	1
Connecticut Hammerheads	3	2	.600	1	51	0	57	0
Chesapeake Bayhawks	3	2	.600	1	67	3	63	1
Boston Cannons	3	2	.600	1	57	2	58	0
Philadelphia Barrage	2	3	.400	2	57	0	64	0
New York Lizards	0	5	.000	4	57	0	65	3

Playoff Seed
