= Greg Gurenlian =

American lacrosse player (born 1984)

Personal information
- Nickname: The Beast
- Nationality: American
- Born: March 23, 1984 (age 42) Springfield, Pennsylvania, U.S.
- Height: 6 ft 1 in (185 cm)
- Weight: 225 lb (102 kg; 16 st 1 lb)

Sport
- Position: Face off Specialist
- NCAA team: Penn State (2006)
- MLL draft: 2006; Rochester Rattlers
- MLL teams: Rochester Rattlers, San Francisco Dragons, Toronto Nationals, Chicago Machine, New York Lizards
- PLL team: Redwoods Lacrosse Club

Career highlights
- 2018 Member of Team USA, 2015 MLL MVP, MLL All Time Leader in Face Off Wins, 2015 MLL champion, Penn State all time faceoff wins leader

Greg Gurenlian (March 23, 1984) is a former professional field lacrosse player from Springfield, Pennsylvania of Armenian descent. He retired as a member of Redwoods Lacrosse Club of the Premier Lacrosse League. He is the founder of The Face-off Academy, a place where young players are trained in faceoffs. He is also the owner of his YouTube page, called GregGurenlian. He is the only faceoff specialist to win the MVP in the MLL.

== College career ==
Gurenlian was a four-year letterman at Penn State University, and was a co-captain in his senior year. He is second all time in ground balls and first all time in faceoff wins.

== Professional career ==
=== MLL ===
Gurenlian was drafted by the Rochester Rattlers in the 2006 MLL draft, where he played for two years before joining the San Francisco Dragons. He played for them for two years before joining the Toronto Nationals and the Chicago Machine for a year each. He played his final eight MLL seasons with the New York Lizards. In 2015, he set the MLL record for most ground balls in a season, most faceoff wins in a season and highest faceoff percentage in a season. He also won the MLL MVP and the Steinfeld Trophy for winning the 2015 MLL Championship. He made the MLL all pro team six times and was an all star five times.

=== PLL career ===
In 2018, Gurenlian announced he would come out of retirement to join Paul Rabil’s new Premier Lacrosse League as a member of the Redwoods Lacrosse Club. On January 22, 2020, after one season in the PLL, he retired.

=== International career ===
Gurenlian was a member of the gold medal-winning Team USA at the 2018 World Lacrosse Championship in Netanya, Israel. He is the US record-holder for international faceoff percentage at a tournament with 81% wins.

== See also ==
- Paul Rabil
- Trevor Baptiste
- Jerry Ragonese
