= Sam Handley =

American lacrosse player

Personal information
- Nationality: American
- Height: 6 ft 5 in (196 cm)
- Weight: 235 lb (107 kg; 16 st 11 lb)

Sport
- Position: Midfielder
- Shoots: Right/Left
- NCAA team: Penn (2023)
- PLL team Former teams: California Redwoods; Denver Outlaws
- Pro career: 2023–

Career highlights
- 3× First-team USILA All-American (2019, 2022, 2023); 3× First-team Inside Lacrosse All-American (2019, 2022, 2023); 2× First-team USA Lacrosse Magazine All-American (2022, 2023); McLaughlin Award (2022); Inside Lacrosse Freshman Of The Year (2019); Ivy League Player of the Year (2022); 3× First-team All-Ivy League (2019, 2022, 2023); Ivy League Rookie Of The Year (2019)

Sam Handley is an American lacrosse player for the California Redwoods of the Premier Lacrosse League. He played college lacrosse at Penn, where he was a three-time All-American and won the McLaughlin Award as the best midfielder in the country.

== Early life ==
A native of Portland, Oregon, Handley was the oldest of three children born to Lisa and JB Handley. He began playing lacrosse at the suggestion of his grandfather, who had played college lacrosse at Dartmouth. Handley looked up to Peter Baum, a fellow Portland native who won the 2012 Tewaaraton Award, later stating that "as kids playing lacrosse in Oregon, we all wanted to be like him".

Handley attended Jesuit High School, where he was a US Lacrosse All-American and first-team OHSLA all-state selection for three straight years. As a sophomore, he led the Crusaders to an appearance in the state championship game. As a senior, Handley was named both the OHSLA Player of the Year and the Oregon Sports Awards Player of the Year, and was selected to play in the Adrenaline All-American Game as one of the top players on the West Coast. He finished his high school career with 421 points (213 goals and 208 assists). Handley also captained the basketball team, earning first-team all-Metro League honors as a senior. He was often tasked with defending the opposing team's dominant post player, such as Kamaka Hepa of Jefferson High School.

Handley was rated as a four-star recruit and was ranked the No. 79 overall recruit in the 2018 class by Inside Lacrosse. As a freshman, he committed to play college lacrosse at Penn.

== College career ==
Handley was recruited as an attackman, but he was converted to a midfielder at Penn to balance out the roster. He was a member of the second unit for his first two games before earning the start in his third game against Penn State, in which he scored three goals. Handley then recorded four goals and three assists in their next game, a win over Villanova, to solidify his spot in the lineup. In his first season at Penn in 2019, he set program freshman records in points (61), goals (35), and assists (26), collecting first-team All-American (USILA, Inside Lacrosse), Inside Lacrosse National Freshman of the Year, Ivy League Rookie of the Year, and first-team all-Ivy League honors. Handley led the Quakers to their first Ivy League double in program history by winning the conference tournament after securing their first outright regular-season title since 1986. In the NCAA tournament, Penn beat Army in the first round – their first NCAA tournament win since 1988 – before losing to Yale in overtime in the quarterfinals. Notably, Hadley had scored the game-winning goal against Yale in triple overtime of their regular-season game in March. He was also named to the USILA National Team Of the Week in April after scoring six goals on six shots in a win against Harvard.

As a sophomore in 2020, Handley played one game for the Quakers, tallying three goals and two assists in their season opener against Maryland, during which he unknowingly suffered a ruptured spleen. He exited the game momentarily, believing his injury to be "bruised ribs or something", before returning to the field. Handley suffered internal bleeding for over six hours following the game before he was taken to Penn Presbyterian Medical Center to undergo an emergency procedure. He had to relearn how to walk through two-and-a-half months of rehab. The remainder of the season was cancelled due to the COVID-19 pandemic, and the Ivy League later cancelled its 2021 season as well, leaving Handley off the field for a second year in a row.

Handley was named a team captain ahead of his senior season in 2022. He produced 36 goals and 37 assists after starting all 16 games, earning first-team All-American (USILA, Inside Lacrosse, USA Lacrosse Magazine), Ivy League Player of the Year, and first-team All-Ivy League honors. His 73 points were the second-most in a season in school history. Handley received the McLaughlin Award as the best midfielder in Division I and became the program's first-ever Tewaaraton Award finalist. In a regular-season win over Princeton, he came within one assist of the program's single-game record with a three-goal, eight-assist showing, and was named to the USILA National Team Of the Week for his performance. Handley led the Quakers to their second straight Ivy League tournament title after he tallied 12 points in two games – the second-most in a tournament in league history. In the first round of the NCAA tournament, he scored three times and assisted the game-winning goal to beat Richmond in overtime. Handley added three assists in their quarterfinal loss to Rutgers.

Ahead of his final season in 2023, Handley was named the Division I national preseason player of the year by USA Lacrosse Magazine. He produced 30 goals and 25 assists in 13 games, earning first-team All-American (USILA, Inside Lacrosse, USA Lacrosse Magazine) and first-team All-Ivy League honors. In the regular-season finale, a win over Albany, Handley tied his career-high by scoring six goals to go along with two assists. However, Penn was defeated by Princeton in the Ivy League tournament semifinals, with Handley putting up two goals and two assists in his final collegiate game. He finished his career at Penn with 104 goals and 90 points, with his 194 points ranking third in program history. Quakers head coach Mike Murphy called Handley "clearly the most talented player we’ve ever had here".

== Professional career ==
=== PLL ===
Handley was selected by the Chrome Lacrosse Club of the Premier Lacrosse League (PLL) with the fourth overall pick of the 2023 PLL draft. As a rookie, he recorded nine goals, a two-pointer and three assists in nine games.

Handley was traded to the California Redwoods on June 9, 2025 for a third-round pick in the 2026 PLL college draft.

=== NLL ===
Handley was selected by the New York Riptide of the National Lacrosse League (NLL) in the fifth round (83rd overall) of the 2022 NLL draft, though the pick was voided since he had not renounced his NCAA eligibility and was thus ineligible.

Handley was subsequently selected by the Vancouver Warriors in the fourth round (55th overall) of the 2023 NLL draft.

== International career ==
Handley was one of nine collegiate players who were invited to try out for the U.S. men's national team ahead of the 2023 World Lacrosse Championship, as well as one of five collegians who made the training roster.

== Statistics ==
=== NCAA ===
Season	Team	GP	GS	G	A	Pts	Sh	GB
2019	Penn	16	15	35	26	61	90	6
2020	Penn	1	1	3	2	5	7	1
2022	Penn	16	16	36	37	73	131	20
2023	Penn	13	12	30	25	55	90	11
Career		46	43	104	90	194	318	38

=== PLL ===
Season	Team	Regular season											Playoffs										
Season	Team	GP	G	2PG	A	Pts	Sh	GB	Pen	PIM	FOW	FOA	GP	G	2PG	A	Pts	Sh	GB	Pen	PIM	FOW	FOA
2023	Chrome	9	10	1	3	14	46	7	1	0.5	0	0	–	–	–	–	–	–	–	–	–	–	–
2024	Denver Outlaws	10	9	1	6	16	45	3	0	0	0	0	1	1	1	2	4	4	0	0	0	0	0
2025	Denver Outlaws	1	0	0	0	0	4	0	0	0	0	0	–	–	–	–	–	–	–	–	–	–	–
2025	California Redwoods	4	3	1	1	5	18	3	0	0	0	0	–	–	–	–	–	–	–	–	–	–	–
		24	22	3	10	35	113	13	1	0.5	0	0	1	1	1	2	4	4	0	0	0	0	0
Career total:		25	23	4	12	39	117	13	1	0.5	0	0											

GP–Games played; G–Goals; 2PG–2-point goals; A–Assists; Pts–Points; Sh–Shots; GB–Ground balls; Pen–Penalties; PIM–Penalty minutes; FOW–Faceoffs won; FOA–Faceoffs attempted
