= Doug Shanahan =

American lacrosse player and coach

Personal information
- Nickname(s): "Shanny", "The Irish Assassin", " Big Doug"
- Born: January 11, 1979 (age 47) Farmingville, New York, U.S.
- Height: 6 ft 1 in (185 cm)

Sport
- Position: Midfield
- NLL draft: 33rd overall, 2001; Albany Attack
- NLL teams: New York Saints
- MLL team Former teams: Long Island Lizards; Florida Launch; Chicago Machine; Philadelphia Barrage
- NCAA team: Hofstra University
- Pro career: 2003–

Doug Shanahan (born January 11, 1979) is a lacrosse coach and player. He has been inducted into four Halls of Fame and has won a number of other trophies and accolades. He was twice a member of Team USA, and also won MVP of the world games. He attended Hofstra University, playing both football and lacrosse in college.

== College career ==
From 1997 to 2001 Shanahan played both lacrosse and football. As a defensive back for the Pride, Shanahan was recognized as a 3 time All American in football. In 2000, he was also a Buck Buchanan Award finalist which is given to the top defensive player in Division 1AA. Following his senior year, he was signed as a free agent with the New York Jets. The Jets allowed Shanahan to go with Team USA and compete in the World Lacrosse Championships in Perth, Australia. Shanahan turned down several football offers from the Canadian Football League to pursue his career in the MLL. At Hofstra, Shanahan also was a 3 time All American in lacrosse, was named the NCAA National Player of the Year and won the McLaughlin Award as the nation's top midfielder. In 1997, he was named the America East rookie of the year. In 2001, he was the inaugural winner of the Tewaaraton Trophy, which is presented yearly to the nation's top college player.

== Professional career ==
=== Lacrosse ===
Shanahan was a member of the 2002 U.S. World Lacrosse Championship title team, in which he received All-World and Championship MVP honors. He was also a member of the 2006 USA World Lacrosse team.

He was drafted by the Bridgeport Barrage (1st overall) in the 2002 MLL Supplemental Draft. He played with Barrage through the 2005 season, helping them capture the 2004 Major League Lacrosse Championship. He was acquired by the Chicago Machine in the 2006 Expansion Draft (1st round, 4th pick) from Philadelphia.

Shanahan also played a half season during the New York Saints last year of the National Lacrosse League in 2002, where he recorded seven goals and four assists in eight games.

=== Football ===
In 2002, Shanahan signed a contract with the New York Jets for training camp.

== Coaching experience ==
Shanahan was head coach of the Glenbrook South Titans of Glenview, Illinois from 2006 to 2008. In his inaugural year as head coach, Shanahan led the Titans to a 4th-place finish in the IHSLA Lacrosse state championship tournament. In his two years at Glenbrook South, Shanahan lead the Titans to the playoffs and finished with an overall record of 26–10. In 2008, Shanahan also coached lacrosse at the University of Illinois, where he led the team to an 11–7 record his first year. That year, the Illini finished in MCLA Division 1 with a ranking of 21st in the nation. In 2009, Doug Shanahan signed on as the new head coach for the Fort Lauderdale, Florida Pine Crest Panthers, leading them to a 12–6 record. Similar to his high school and college days, Doug also was a part of the football squad as the Quarterback coach. In 2013, Shanahan left Pine Crest to coach at St. Thomas Aquinas as Asst Head Coach. Shanahan took the Raiders to the Final Four in 2014. Shanahan coached at St Brendan as Asst. Athletic Director and Head Lacrosse Coach in the fall of 2014 & 2015. In 2017, Shanahan moved back to Broward County, Florida to coach the Western Wildcats. In his first season of coaching at Western, the school won its first ever Lacrosse District Championship. In 2019, he was named as the coach of Team England.

== After Lacrosse ==
Shanahan taught at Pine Crest Preparatory School in Ft. Lauderdale for five years. He is a teacher and boys lacrosse coach. In 2014 he was the lacrosse coach at St Brendan High School Miami, Florida and the assistant athletic director. In June 2015, it was announced that Shanahan would be joining Legacy Travel Intl. as a lacrosse consultant. He is now the P.E coach at Imagine Charter School at Weston in Weston, Fl. He is also running a lacrosse camp.

== Statistics ==
=== MLL ===
		Regular Season						Playoffs
Season	Team	GP	G	A	Pts	LB	PIM	GP	G	A	Pts	LB	PIM
2003	Bridgeport	13	36	2	38	21	7.5	2	6	2	8	4	0
2004	Philadelphia	10	28	2	30	24	3.5	2	3	0	3	4	1.0
2005	Philadelphia	12	29	3	32	8	1.0	2	6	0	6	4	1.0
2006	Chicago	10	28	2	30	24	3.5	2	3	0	3	4	1.0
2007	Chicago	12	29	3	32	8	1.0	2	6	0	6	4	1.0
2008	Chicago	10	28	2	30	24	3.5	2	3	0	3	4	1.0
2009	Chicago	3	6	1	8	4	1.0	--	--	--	--	--	--
2009	Long Island	1	0	0	0	0	0	--	--	--	--	--	--
2014	Florida	2	0	0	0	0	0	-	-	-	-	-	-
MLL Totals		38	79	8	109	57	12.5	6	15	2	17	12	2.0

=== Hofstra University ===
Season	Team	GP	G	A	Pts	PPG
1998	Hofstra	14	15	9	24	--
1999	Hofstra	16	21	14	35	--
2000	Hofstra	16	16	8	24	--
2001	Hofstra	17	43	13	56	--
NCAA Totals		63	95	44	139	--

== Awards ==
Preceded by None	Men's Tewaaraton Trophy; 2001	Succeeded by Michael Powell
Preceded by Josh Sims	McLaughlin Award; 2001	Succeeded by Kevin Cassese
