= 2015 Major League Lacrosse season =

2015 MLL season
- League: Major League Lacrosse
- Sport: Field lacrosse
- Duration: April 12, 2015 – August 8, 2015
- Teams: 8

2015
- Season MVP: Greg Gurenlian
- Finals champions: New York Lizards
- Runners-up: Rochester Rattlers
- Finals MVP: Paul Rabil

MLL seasons
- ← 2014 season 2016 season →

The 2015 Major League Lacrosse season was the 16th season of FIL-sanctioned lacrosse in the United States and Canada, the 16th with a national first-division league, and the 15th season of Major League Lacrosse. The season featured 8 total clubs (all in the United States). The regular season was held from April 12 through July 25, with the semifinals on August 1 and the championship game on August 8 in Kennesaw, Georgia. The defending Steinfeld Cup champions are the Denver Outlaws, while the Rochester Rattlers finished as the runner-up.

== Milestones & events ==
- January 23, 2015- The Collegiate Draft took place in Baltimore, Maryland. The draft was live to watch on ESPN 3.
- July 4, 2015- Once again, the Denver Outlaws set an attendance record on their annual 4 July game with 31,644. However, those fans watched the Outlaws get demolished by Boston, 22-9.

== Teams ==
=== Stadiums and locations ===
| Boston Cannons | Charlotte Hounds | Chesapeake Bayhawks | Denver Outlaws |
|---|---|---|---|
| Gillette Stadium | American Legion Memorial Stadium | Navy–Marine Corps Memorial Stadium | Sports Authority Field at Mile High |
| Capacity: 68,756 | Capacity: 21,000 | Capacity: 34,000 | Capacity: 76,125 |

Locations of teams for the 2015 Major League Lacrosse season
Active Teams

| Florida Launch | New York Lizards | Ohio Machine | Rochester Rattlers |
|---|---|---|---|
| FAU Stadium | James M. Shuart Stadium | Selby Field | Eunice Kennedy Shriver Stadium |
| Capacity: 29,419 | Capacity: 11,929 | Capacity: 9,100 | Capacity: 11,000 |

== Standings ==
Playoff Seed

2015 Major League Lacrosse Standings
| | W | L | PCT | GB | GF | 2ptGF | GA | 2ptGA |
|---|---|---|---|---|---|---|---|---|
| New York Lizards | 10 | 4 | .714 | - | 206 | 5 | 167 | 15 |
| Ohio Machine | 9 | 5 | .643 | 1 | 195 | 9 | 171 | 4 |
| Rochester Rattlers | 8 | 6 | .571 | 2 | 185 | 7 | 185 | 7 |
| Boston Cannons | 8 | 6 | .571 | 2 | 184 | 16 | 183 | 5 |
| Denver Outlaws | 7 | 7 | .500 | 3 | 198 | 4 | 203 | 11 |
| Chesapeake Bayhawks | 6 | 8 | .429 | 4 | 171 | 1 | 170 | 6 |
| Florida Launch | 5 | 9 | .357 | 5 | 182 | 7 | 197 | 5 |
| Charlotte Hounds | 3 | 11 | .214 | 7 | 160 | 9 | 205 | 5 |

== All Star Game ==
The All Star Game, was held on June 13, 2015 at BBVA Compass Stadium in Houston, Texas. It was the first time an MLL event has been hosted in the Houston area.

== Playoffs ==
The Semi Final games were held at Delaware, Ohio and Hempstead, New York. The championship game was played at Fifth Third Bank Stadium in Kennesaw, Georgia starting at 7 pm EDT.

Semifinals; August 1
1 | New York | 16^{OT}
4 | Boston | 15
2 | Ohio | 8
3 | Rochester | 12

Championship; August 8
1 | New York | 15
3 | Rochester | 12
