= Nicky Polanco =

American lacrosse player (born 1980)

Personal information
- Nationality: American
- Born: August 18, 1980 (age 45)
- Height: 6 ft 4 in (193 cm)
- Weight: 235 lb (107 kg; 16 st 11 lb)

Sport
- Position: Defense
- Shoots: Right
- NCAA team: Hofstra (2002)
- NLL draft: 15th overall, 2002; New York Saints
- NLL teams: New York Saints
- MLL draft: 4th overall, 2002; Bridgeport Barrage
- MLL teams: Bridgeport/Philadelphia Barrage; New York/Long Island Lizards; Chesapeake Bayhawks
- Pro career: 2002–2015

Nicholas Polanco (born August 18, 1980) is an American former lacrosse player. He is regarded as one of the best defensemen in MLL (and professional lacrosse in general) history. He attended Oceanside High School.

== Professional career ==
Polanco was drafted by the Bridgeport Barrage in the 1st round (4th overall) of the 2002 Major League Lacrosse Collegiate Draft. In 2004, he was awarded the Major League Lacrosse Defensive Player of the Year Award and led the Barrage to winning the Steinfeld Cup.

In 2005, Polanco was traded to the Long Island Lizards where he was again given the Major League Lacrosse Defensive Player of the Year Award and was selected for his second consecutive All-Star game.

Polanco played just one season in the National Lacrosse League with the New York Saints in 2003.

His brother, Armando, played for both the Philadelphia Barrage and New York Saints.

On May 17, 2012, Polanco was traded to the Chesapeake Bayhawks.

== Collegiate career ==
Polanco transferred to Hofstra University, for his final two years of eligibility, after playing two seasons at Nassau Community College. While at Nassau, Polanco lead his team to win the National Junior College Athletic Association championships in 1999 and 2000. He was named National Junior College Athletic Association Player of the Year.

Following his transfer, Polanco earned All-America honors each of his two years at Hofstra, and as a senior he was named Colonial Athletic Association Player and Defensive Player of the Year.

== Honors and awards ==
• Member of 2006 U.S. Men's National Team
• Named alternate to the 2002 U.S. Men's National Team
• Colonial Athletic Association Player of the Year (2002)
• 1st Team All-American (2002) & Honorable Mention All-American (2001)
• National Junior College Athletic Association Player of the Year (1999, 2000 at Nassau C.C.) Richard D'Agostino is the former doctor for the Long Island Lizards.

Preceded by Ryan Curtis	Major League Lacrosse Defensive Player of the Year Award; 2004 & 2005	Succeeded by Brodie Merrill

== Statistics ==
=== MLL ===
Season	Team	Regular season											Playoffs										
Season	Team	GP	G	2PG	A	Pts	Sh	GB	Pen	PIM	FOW	FOA	GP	G	2PG	A	Pts	Sh	GB	Pen	PIM	FOW	FOA
2002	Bridgeport Barrage	4	2	0	0	2	2	7	0	1	0	0	–	–	–	–	–	–	–	–	–	–	–
2003	Bridgeport Barrage	12	1	0	1	2	11	53	0	11	0	0	–	–	–	–	–	–	–	–	–	–	–
2004	Philadelphia Barrage	12	0	0	1	1	1	35	0	4.5	0	0	2	0	0	1	1	0	14	0	0	0	0
2005	Long Island Lizards	12	1	0	0	1	4	44	0	7.5	0	0	2	0	0	0	0	0	0	0	2	0	0
2006	Long Island Lizards	10	0	0	0	0	3	40	0	6	0	0	–	–	–	–	–	–	–	–	–	–	–
2007	Long Island Lizards	12	1	0	1	2	2	35	0	8	0	0	–	–	–	–	–	–	–	–	–	–	–
2008	Long Island Lizards	12	0	0	0	0	1	38	0	18	0	0	–	–	–	–	–	–	–	–	–	–	–
2009	Long Island Lizards	6	0	0	0	0	0	19	0	6	0	0	1	0	0	0	0	0	1	0	0	0	0
2010	Long Island Lizards	11	0	0	1	1	2	46	0	5	0	0	2	0	0	0	0	0	6	0	7	0	0
2011	Long Island Lizards	11	0	0	3	3	0	36	0	3.5	0	0	–	–	–	–	–	–	–	–	–	–	–
2012	Chesapeake Bayhawks	11	0	0	0	0	0	29	0	12.5	0	0	2	0	0	0	0	0	8	0	1	0	0
2013	Chesapeake Bayhawks	11	1	0	0	1	2	26	0	3.5	0	0	1	0	0	0	0	0	2	0	0	0	0
2014	Chesapeake Bayhawks	14	2	0	1	3	4	34	0	11.5	0	0	–	–	–	–	–	–	–	–	–	–	–
2015	New York Lizards	4	0	0	0	0	0	4	0	0.5	0	0	–	–	–	–	–	–	–	–	–	–	–
2015	Chesapeake Bayhawks	2	0	0	0	0	0	3	0	1	0	0	–	–	–	–	–	–	–	–	–	–	–
		144	8	0	8	16	32	449	0	99.5	0	0	10	0	0	1	1	0	31	0	10	0	0
Career total:		154	8	0	9	17	32	480	0	109.5	0	0											

GP–Games played; G–Goals; 2PG–2-point goals; A–Assists; Pts–Points; Sh–Shots; GB–Ground balls; Pen–Penalties; PIM–Penalty minutes; FOW–Faceoffs won; FOA–Faceoffs attempted

=== NLL ===
		Regular Season						Playoffs
Season	Team	GP	G	A	Pts	LB	PIM	GP	G	A	Pts	LB	PIM
2003	New York	16	1	4	5	91	13	-	-	-	-	-	-
NLL totals		16	1	4	5	91	13	-	-	-	-	-	-

=== College ===
Year	Team	Goals	Assists	Pts	LB
2001	Hofstra	1	3	4	70
2002	Hofstra	2	3	5	73
Career		3	6	9	143
