= Roy Colsey =

American lacrosse player

Personal information
- Nickname: Big Colse
- Nationality: American
- Born: July 29, 1973 (age 53) Newark, New Jersey, U.S.
- Height: 6 ft 2 in (188 cm)
- Weight: 214 lb (97 kg; 15 st 4 lb)

Sport
- Position: Transition/Midfield
- Shoots: Right
- NLL teams: New York Titans; Buffalo Bandits; Anaheim Storm; New Jersey Storm; New York Saints; Rochester Knighthawks
- MLL teams: Bridgeport/Philadelphia Barrage
- Pro career: 1996–2007

Roy Colsey (born July 29, 1973 in Yorktown Heights, New York) is a former professional lacrosse player who last played for the Philadelphia Barrage in Major League Lacrosse.

== College career ==
Roy attended Syracuse University, where he was a third-team All-American in 1992 and was a first-team All-American from 1993 to 1995. In 1995 he was awarded the Donald McLaughlin Award for National Division 1 Men's Lacrosse Midfielder of the Year. He won two national championships with the Orangemen ('93, '95). He graduated from Syracuse University in 1995.

== Professional career ==
=== MLL ===
Colsey played for the Barrage his entire MLL career, and holds several franchise records, including goals, points and two-pointers. In 2004, 2006, and 2007, Roy led the Barrage to MLL championships. In 2006, he was selected to the Men's U.S. National Lacrosse Team.

=== NLL ===
Before Colsey joined the MLL, he played in the National Lacrosse League (NLL) for nine seasons. He played for the Rochester Knighthawks, New York Saints, New Jersey / Anaheim Storm and Buffalo Bandits. After a two-year break, Colsey returned to the NLL briefly in 2007 with the expansion New York Titans.

== Personal ==
Colsey currently coaches the varsity lacrosse team at Ridgefield High School, where he helped capture the school's first ever FCIAC Championship in Lacrosse and second State Championship. He is the founder and head coach of Team Superstar. He is now a physical education teacher at Robert E. Bell Middle School in Chappaqua, New York, where he has taught since 2003 and has coached extensively.

== Statistics ==
=== NLL ===
		Regular Season						Playoffs
Season	Team	GP	G	A	Pts	LB	PIM	GP	G	A	Pts	LB	PIM
1996	Rochester	2	1	0	1	2	0	--	--	--	--	--	--
1997	New York	10	13	5	18	24	27	1	2	1	3	6	0
1998	New York	12	10	21	31	46	25	--	--	--	--	--	--
1999	New York	10	10	17	27	40	8	--	--	--	--	--	--
2000	New York	12	37	31	68	87	18	--	--	--	--	--	--
2001	New York	14	51	25	76	92	52	--	--	--	--	--	--
2002	New York	11	36	21	57	61	24	--	--	--	--	--	--
2002	Buffalo	6	11	8	19	35	4	--	--	--	--	--	--
2003	New Jersey	16	34	30	64	71	13	--	--	--	--	--	--
2004	Anaheim	8	11	9	20	30	6	--	--	--	--	--	--
2004	Buffalo	2	1	1	2	10	2	--	--	--	--	--	--
2007	New York	4	1	10	11	12	2	--	--	--	--	--	--
NLL totals		107	216	178	394	510	181	1	2	1	3	6	0

=== MLL ===
		Regular Season							Playoffs
Season	Team	GP	G	2ptG	A	Pts	LB	PIM	GP	G	2ptG	A	Pts	LB	PIM
2001	Bridgeport	0	0	0	11	41	21	5	0	0	0	0	0	0	0
2002	Bridgeport	0	0	0	4	37	36	5	0	0	0	0	0	0	0
2003	Bridgeport	0	0	0	7	33	37	9	0	0	0	0	0	0	0
2004	Philadelphia	0	0	0	7	38	17	6	2	5	0	1	6	6	1
2005	Philadelphia	0	8	0	5	15	5	0	0	0	0	0	0	0	0
2006	Philadelphia	0	27	0	12	45	15	5	2	10	2	3	15	3	1
2007	Philadelphia	0	27	0	8	36	24	2	2	7	1	1	9	4	2
2008	Philadelphia	7	13	0	9	23	13	2.5	1	3	0	3	6	2	1
MLL Totals		85	0	33	63	268	168	34.5	7	25	3	6	39	17	6

== Awards ==
Preceded by Dom Fin	McLaughlin Award; 1995	Succeeded by Casey Powell & Jason Wade

== See also ==
- Syracuse Orange men's lacrosse
