= Kyle Dixon (lacrosse) =

American lacrosse player (born 1984)

Personal information
- Nationality: American
- Born: November 26, 1984 (age 41) Annapolis, Maryland, U.S.
- Height: 6 ft 4 in (193 cm)
- Weight: 214 lb (97 kg; 15 st 4 lb)

Sport
- Position: Midfield
- NLL draft: 43rd overall, 2006; Philadelphia Wings
- MLL team Former teams: Chesapeake Bayhawks; Washington Bayhawks
- NCAA team: University of Virginia
- Pro career: 2006–

Kyle Dixon (born November 26, 1984) is a professional lacrosse player with the Chesapeake Bayhawks of Major League Lacrosse. He played high school lacrosse for Archbishop Spalding High School in Severn, Maryland.

== College career ==
Dixon played college lacrosse at the University of Virginia from 2003 to 2006. He won two Division I National Championships while with the Cavaliers, in 2003 and 2006. Dixon was selected as a second-team All American during his junior season and a first-team All-American during his senior season while also being nominated as a Tewaaraton Trophy finalist. In 2006, he also won the McLaughlin Award as the nation's best midfielder.

== Professional career ==
2007: Dixon led the team in points with 22 goals and 17 assists for 41 total points. He also recorded 23 ground balls on the season. Dixon led all MLL midfielders in assists and was named to the 2007 MLL All-Star team and the All-MLL team. He also competed in the 2007 Bud Light Skills fastest shot competition.

2006: Dixon recorded 8 points in his rookie season with the Bayhawks. His playing time was limited due to a hand injury he suffered in the Men's Lacrosse Division I National Championship Game. Dixon was drafted second overall in the 2006 MLL Collegiate Draft by the Bayhawks.

Dixon leads the MLL all time in 2 point goals. As of 2012 Dixon has 47 career 2 point goals.

== Statistics ==
=== Major League Lacrosse ===
		Regular Season							Playoffs
Season	Team	GP	G	2ptG	A	Pts	LB	PIM	GP	G	2ptG	A	Pts	LB	PIM
2006	Baltimore	5	3	0	5	8	13	2	--	--	--	--	--	--	--
2007	Washington	12	22	2	17	41	23	4	--	--	--	--	--	--	--
2008	Washington	12	22	5	11	38	11	5	--	--	--	--	--	--	--
2009	Washington	11	23	10	8	41	14	7	--	--	--	--	--	--	--
MLL Totals		40	70	17	41	128	61	18	--	--	--	--	--	--	--
