= Lakewood Stadium =

High school sports stadium in Atlanta, Georgia

- Lakewood
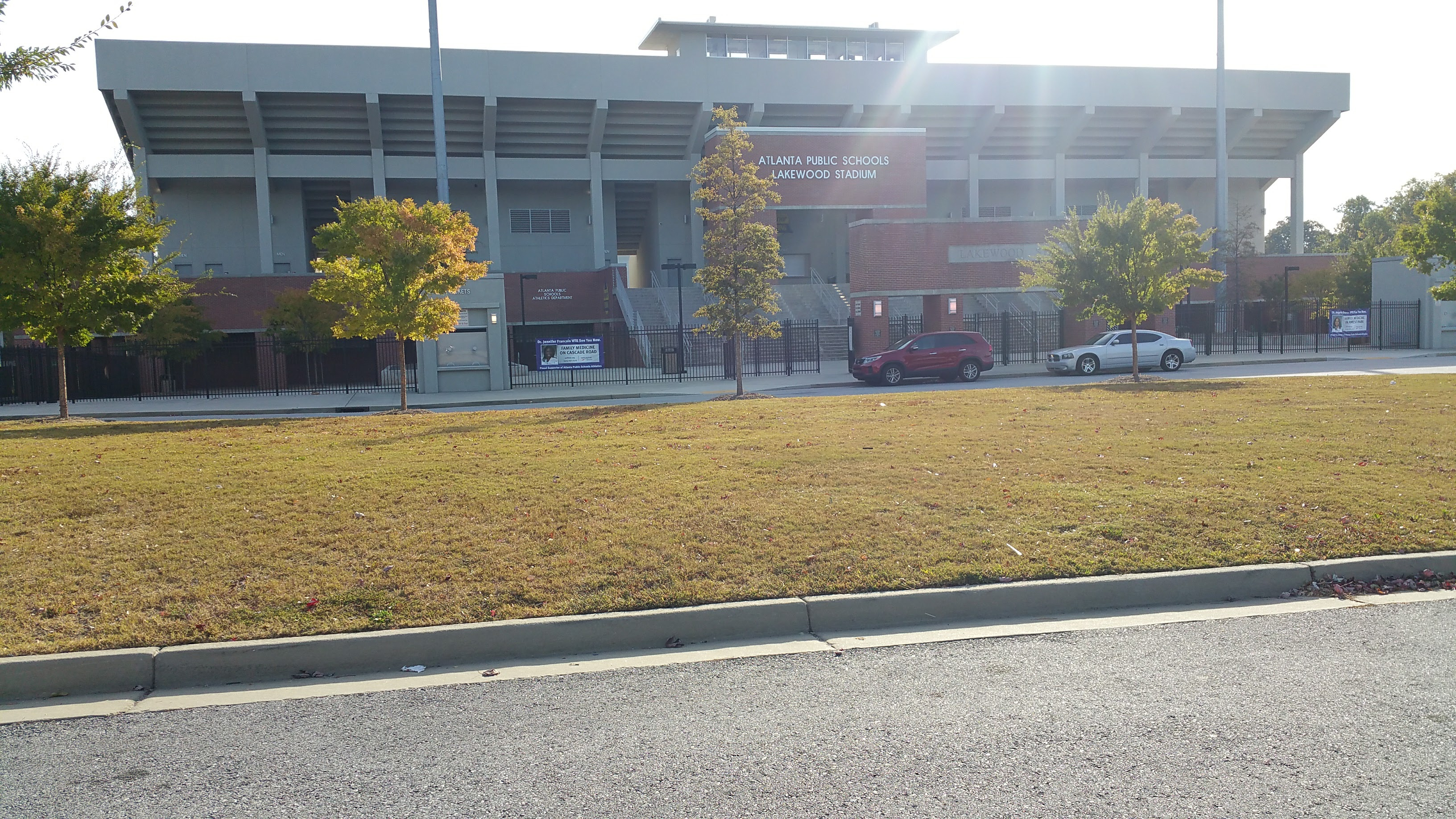
- Home side after renovation
- Interactive map of Lakewood Stadium
- Location: 70 Claire Drive, Atlanta, Georgia
- Coordinates: 33°42′10″N 84°23′15″W
- Owner: Atlanta Public Schools
- Operator: Atlanta Public Schools
- Capacity: 10,000
- Surface: Field turf

Construction
- Opened: 1971

Tenant
- Atlanta Public Schools (GHSA)

Lakewood Stadium is a 10,000 seat stadium located in the Lakewood Heights neighborhood of southeast Atlanta, Georgia. The stadium is the larger of two stadiums owned and managed by the Atlanta Public Schools system. The other stadium is Eddie S Henderson Stadium, located on the campus of Midtown High School. In October 2006, Lakewood received an Honorable Mention in the Atlanta Journal-Constitution as one of the top 10 high school stadiums in the state of Georgia. As chosen by the voters of Atlanta, Lakewood was picked as the 4th best stadium for high school football in the Atlanta metro area.

As the largest stadium in the Atlanta Public Schools system, it essentially has been the home field for several future NFL players, including Jamal Lewis and Ahmad Carroll (Douglass), Lawrence Smith (Washington), Kelly Campbell (Mays), David Rocker, Tracy Rocker, and Corey Barlow (Fulton), Greg Favors (Southside), Kelvin Pritchett (Therrell) and Super Bowl XX MVP Richard Dent (Murphy).

== History ==
Lakewood Stadium opened in 1971 and was the first high school stadium in the state of Georgia to have artificial turf.

Lakewood Stadium was the site of the 1975 GHSA Class AAA Football Championship Game between Douglass High School and Central High School (Macon). Central (Macon) defeated home team Douglass 21–14.

Lakewood Stadium has been used in commercial shoots and currently for the BET TV show The Game. This stadium is featured in the 2009 horror-comedy film Zombieland.

In 2012, Lakewood Stadium was reopened after a $17 million renovation. The stadium received new lights and sound systems, new stands and playing surfaces and other upgrades.
