= 2012 Long Island Lizards season =

2012 Long Island Lizards
- League: Major League Lacrosse

This was the 2012 season of the Long Island Lizards, a Major League Lacrosse team in Long Island, New York.

== Regular season ==
Win	Loss

Date & Time	Away team	Score	Home team	Score	Game Notes/Scoring Leader
April 28 @ 7 PM	Chesapeake	13	Long Island	11	-
May 12 @ 9 PM	Long Island	11	Denver	19	-
May 19 @ 7 PM	Long Island	10	Charlotte	9	-
June 1 @ 7 PM	Ohio	10	Long Island	20	-
June 13 @ 7 PM	Long Island	13	Boston	10	-
June 16 @ 7 PM	Long Island	16	Ohio	12	-
June 23 @ 7 PM	Denver	8	Long Island	14	-
July 6 @ 7 PM	Long Island	8	Rochester	13	-
July 7 @ 7:30 PM	Rochester	17	Long Island	15	-
July 14 @ 7 PM	Boston	11	Long Island	14	-
July 21 @ 7 PM	Hamilton	12	Long Island	19	-
July 28 @ 7 PM	Charlotte	9	Long Island	13	-
August 4 @ 7pm	Long Island	6	Chesapeake	13	-
August 11 @ 7pm	Long Island	8	Hamilton	18	-
August 25 @ 1pm	Long Island	12	Denver	13	Playoff Game
