= 2021 Cannons Lacrosse Club season =

The 2021 Cannons Lacrosse Club season was the Cannons Lacrosse Club's 21st season and their first Premier Lacrosse League season.

== Schedule ==
2021 schedule
Date	Opponent	Result
June 4	Redwoods Lacrosse Club	L 12-13
June 6	Waterdogs	W 13-7
June 12	Whipsnakes	L 15-14
June 27	Atlas	L 17-18
July 3	Chaos	L 10-14
July 9	Waterdogs	L 19-7
July 11	Archers	W 13-12
August 1	Atlas	L 12-13
August 14	Chrome	W 13-10
August 20	Archers	L10-13

== Expansion ==
It was announced that the Cannons would join the PLL as part of the MLL–PLL merger on December 16, 2020. They held their expansion draft on March 13, 2021.

== Rebrand ==
The Cannons moved from Veterans Memorial Stadium (Quincy, Massachusetts) to Medford when hosting their preseason training. They also rebranded from the "Boston Cannons" to Cannons Lacrosse Club.

== Regular season ==
The Cannons played their first PLL game in Gillette Stadium on June 4, 2021 in a 12-13 loss to Redwoods Lacrosse Club. They finished the season 3-6, earning a playoff spot.

== Playoffs ==
The Cannons were eliminated from the playoffs in a quarterfinals 13-9 loss to Atlas Lacrosse Club.
