= McLaughlin Award =

Annual award given by the United States Intercollegiate Lacrosse Association

The Lt. Donald MacLaughlin Jr. Award — also known as the "Don MacLaughlin Award" — has been given annually since 1973 by the United States Intercollegiate Lacrosse Association (USILA) to the NCAA's most outstanding college lacrosse midfielder. The award is presented to the best midfielder in Division I, Division II, and — until recently — Division III. The outstanding midfielder in Division III now receives the new "Fran McCall Award". Also, the new "Long Pole Midfielder of the Year" award is given in Divisions II and III.

The award is named after LTJG Donald Clay MacLaughlin, Jr, USN, United States Naval Academy (USNA), Class of 1963, Catonsville High School, Class of 1959. An All-American midfielder for Navy, who died on a combat mission in South Vietnam in 1966.

MacLaughlin was a leading midfielder and scorer on three consecutive Division 1 National Championship Navy Lacrosse Teams ('61, '62, '63), and First Team All-American. He was also an All-American and Captain of the 1963 Navy Soccer team, leading Navy to its first appearance in the final NCAA Division-1 championship game. As USNA's best athlete, "Mac" was awarded the U.S. Naval Academy's most prestigious, athletic award, "The Sword", presented by the Naval Academy Athletic Association (NAAA).

== Award winners by year (Division I) ==
Year	Player	School
1973	Douglas M. Schreiber	Maryland
1974	Frank Urso	Maryland
1975	Douglas Radebaugh	Maryland
1976	Frank Urso	Maryland
1977	Mike Page	Penn
1978	Bob Hendrickson	Cornell
1979	Dave Huntley	Johns Hopkins
1980	John Driscoll	Virginia
1981	Brendan M. Schneck	Johns Hopkins
1982	Rick Giusto	Virginia
1983	Peter Voelkel	North Carolina
1984	Delverne Dressel	Johns Hopkins
1985	Delverne Dressel	Johns Hopkins
1986	Glen Miles	Navy
1987	Todd Curry	Syracuse
1988	Gary Gait	Syracuse
1989	Gary Gait	Syracuse
1990	John Reese	Yale
1991	Rob Shek	Towson
1992	Jim Buczek	North Carolina
1993	Ryan Wade	North Carolina
1994	Dom Fin	Syracuse
1995	Roy Colsey	Syracuse
1996	Casey Powell; Jason Wade	Syracuse; North Carolina
1997	Jim Gonnella	Duke
1998	Josh Sims	Princeton
1999	Jay Jalbert	Virginia
2000	Josh Sims	Princeton
2001	Doug Shanahan	Hofstra
2002	Kevin Cassese	Duke
2003	Chris Rotelli	Virginia
2004	Kyle Harrison	Johns Hopkins
2005	Kyle Harrison	Johns Hopkins
2006	Joe Boulukos; Kyle Dixon	Cornell; Virginia
2007	Paul Rabil	Johns Hopkins
2008	Steven Brooks	Syracuse
2009	Max Seibald	Cornell
2010	Joel White	Syracuse
2011	Kevin Crowley	Stony Brook
2012	C.J. Costabile	Duke
2013	Tom Schreiber	Princeton
2014	Tom Schreiber	Princeton
2015	Myles Jones	Duke
2016	Myles Jones	Duke
2017	Trevor Baptiste	Denver
2018	Trevor Baptiste	Denver
2019	Zach Goodrich	Towson
2020	None	(Season canceled due to COVID-19 Pandemic)
2021	Jared Connors	Virginia
2022	Sam Handley	Penn
2023	Thomas McConvey	Virginia
2024	Shane Knobloch	Rutgers
2025	Aidan Maguire	Duke
2026	Brady Wambach; Evan Plunkett	North Carolina; Army

== Number of awards by school (Division I) ==
Rank	School	Awards
1	Syracuse University	8
2	Johns Hopkins University	7
2	University of Virginia	7
4	Duke University	6
5	University of North Carolina	5
6	University of Maryland	4
6	Princeton University	4
8	Cornell University	3
8	University of Denver	2
8	Towson University	2
8	University of Pennsylvania	2
12	U.S. Naval Academy	1
12	Yale University	1
12	Hofstra University	1
12	Stony Brook University	1
12	Rutgers University	1

== See also ==
- United States Navy Memorial#Other Navy memorials
- Jack Turnbull Award
- Lt. Raymond Enners Award
- Schmeisser Award
