= Connecticut Hammerheads =

American field lacrosse team

- Sport: Lacrosse
- Founded: 2020
- Folded: 2020
- League: Major League Lacrosse
- Based in: Fairfield, Connecticut
- Stadium: Rafferty Stadium
- President: Ian Frenette
- Head coach: Bill Warder

The Connecticut Hammerheads were a Major League Lacrosse (MLL) professional men's field lacrosse team based in Fairfield, Connecticut. The team played for one season during the 2020 season. The team's home field was Rafferty Stadium located on the campus of Fairfield University.

== History ==
On February 11, 2020, MLL announced that it had granted an expansion franchise to the Fairfield, Connecticut, one day after the league folded the Dallas Rattlers. The team was the league's second in the state of Connecticut; the Bridgeport Barrage operated there from 2001 to 2003 before relocating to Philadelphia. The league named Rattlers' head coach Bill Warder to the same position with the Connecticut Hammerheads.

Less than a week later, the Hammerheads announced they were trading Bryce Wasserman, a Dallas native, to the Boston Cannons in exchange for Will Sands.

The Hammerheads had seven picks in the collegiate draft, including the second overall pick. They used that option on Michael Kraus, an attack from the defending NCAA champion Virginia Cavaliers. Kraus was also a selection with the competing Premier Lacrosse League, but on May 14 he officially signed a two-year deal to join the Hammerheads.

On July 18, the Hammerheads played their first game, in quarantined fashion at Navy-Marine Corps Memorial Stadium in Annapolis, against the Denver Outlaws. The Outlaws controlled the game from the start, defeating Connecticut, 18-6. Ryan McNamara had the first goal in franchise history and Bradley Voigt led the team with three goals on the night.

Four days later, the team got its first victory in franchise history against the New York Lizards, 10-8. Kraus picked up his first two career goals and Voigt again led the way with four scores. Defending Goalie of the Year Sean Sconone stopped 65% of the shots he faced. The team picked up its second win the next day against the Boston Cannons by a score of 11-8. Sconone dazzled with a new franchise record 73.3 save percentage. With their 14-9 win over the Chesapeake Bayhawks on July 24 in the regular season finale, the Hammerheads would clinch the second overall playoff seed in their first season.

== Season-by-season ==
Connecticut Hammerheads
Year	W	L	%	Regular season finish	Playoffs
2020	3	2	.600	2nd in league	Semifinal vs. Bayhawks canceled
Totals	3	2	.600		Total Playoff Record 0-0 Playoff Win % = .000

== Head coaching history ==
#	Name	Term	Regular season				Playoffs			
#	Name	Term	GC	W	L	W%	GC	W	L	W%
1	Bill Warder	2020	5	3	2	.600	-	-	-	-

== Roster ==
#	Name	Nationality	Position	Height	Weight	College
1	Bradley Voigt	(United States)	A	6 ft 0 in	202 lbs	Syracuse
2	Michael Kraus	(United States)	A	5 ft 11 in	195 lbs	Virginia
3	Christian Carson-Banister	(United States)	G	6 ft 1 in	205 lbs	Boston University
4	Kris Alleyne	(United States)	G	5 ft 11 in	190 lbs	Rutgers
5	Michael Brown	(United States)	D	6 ft 1 in	200 lbs	Brown
6	Ben Martin	(United States)	A	6 ft 0 in	177 lbs	Dartmouth
7	Luke Wittenberg	(United States)	M	6 ft 4 in	187 lbs	Georgetown
8	Ryan Beville (A)	(United States)	M	6 ft 2 in	180 lbs	Jacksonville
10	Tom Moore	(United States)	M	6 ft 3 in	190 lbs	Binghamton
11	Michael Bender	(United States)	LSM	5 ft 11 in	180 lbs	Maryland
12	Gunnar Schimoler	(United States)	D	6 ft 3 in	205 lbs	UMBC
14	Jake Seau	(United States)	M	6 ft 2 in	205 lbs	Duke
15	Dan Lomas	(Canada)	A	5 ft 11 in	186 lbs	High Point
16	Will Renz	(United States)	SSDM	6 ft 0 in	200 lbs	Yale
17	Adam Osika	(United States)	M	6 ft 3 in	205 lbs	Albany
18	Matt Farrell	(United States)	D	5 ft 10 in	175 lbs	Holy Cross
19	Jack Curran	(United States)	M	6 ft 0 in	185 lbs	Villanova
20	Drew Schantz	(United States)	M	6 ft 0 in	200 lbs	Notre Dame
21	Trevor Smyth	(Canada)	LSM	6 ft 2 in	195 lbs	RIT
22	Will Sands	(United States)	A	5 ft 10 in	183 lbs	Bucknell
23	Cody Radziewicz	(United States)	M	5 ft 11 in	185 lbs	Johns Hopkins
28	Robert Mooney	(United States)	D	6 ft 4 in	215 lbs	Yale
29	Noah Rak	(United States)	FO	N/A	N/A	UMass
31	Sean Sconone (C)	(United States)	G	5 ft 11	270 lbs	UMass
33	Landon Kramer	(United States)	D	6 ft 3 in	225 lbs	Sacred Heart
41	Justin Schwenk	(United States)	FO	6 ft 0 in	185 lbs	Virginia
47	Joe Gillis	(United States)	M	6 ft 0 in	195 lbs	Syracuse
50	Hayden La Vangie	(United States)	LSM	6 ft 1 in	195 lbs	Jacksonville
51	Brendan Collins	(United States)	M	6 ft 2 in	201 lbs	Notre Dame
57	Greg Weyl	(United States)	D	6 ft 2 in	205 lbs	Mercyhurst
81	Ryan McNamara (A)	(United States)	A	5 ft 8 in	185 lbs	Marquette
88	Andrew Helmer	(United States)	LSM	6 ft 1 in	201 lbs	Syracuse
90	Kyle Buchanan	(Canada)	M	5 ft 8 in	165 lbs	Robert Morris
91	Ryan Fournier	(Canada)	LSM	5 ft 9 in	190 lbs	Loyola

(C)- captain

(A)- alternate captain
