= 2020 Major League Lacrosse season =

20th season of Major League Lacrosse

2020 MLL season
- League: Major League Lacrosse
- Sport: Field lacrosse
- Duration: July 18–26, 2020
- Teams: 6

Steinfeld Cup
- Champions: Boston Cannons
- Runners-up: Denver Outlaws
- Finals []: Bryce Wasserman

MLL seasons
- ← 2019 season

The 2020 Major League Lacrosse season was the 20th season of Major League Lacrosse. Each of the six teams were slated to play a ten-game regular season starting on May 30, until the COVID-19 pandemic suspended the season. On July 2, the league announced teams would play a five-game regular season over the course of a quarantined week in Annapolis, Maryland at Navy-Marine Corps Memorial Stadium, the home of the Chesapeake Bayhawks. The regular season was scheduled to begin play on Saturday, July 18 with a four-team postseason the next weekend on July 25–26.

The Bayhawks entered the season as defending champions. They claimed their sixth title after defeating the Denver Outlaws, 10–9 in the 2019 Steinfeld Cup Game at Dick's Sporting Goods Park in Denver.

For the second consecutive offseason, the landscape of the league changed dramatically. On January 14, the league announced the switch from a franchise model to a single-entity structure, meaning they will operate all six teams in 2020. On February 10, the league ceased operations of the Dallas Rattlers and moved the players and team staff to a new franchise, the Connecticut Hammerheads. The next week, the league ceased operations of the Atlanta Blaze and relocated the roster and coaches to relaunch the Philadelphia Barrage.

On the last evening of the shortened regular season, an unnamed player reported to team officials exhibiting symptoms of COVID-19. All league players were tested the next day. In result, the semifinal games on July 25 were canceled and the Bayhawks and Hammerheads, who were scheduled to play in the semifinal round, backed out of the postseason. The league announced the canceled semifinal game between the top seed Denver Outlaws and fourth seed and Boston Cannons would be pushed to July 26 and act as the championship game. Boston defeated Denver 13–10 to claim their second championship in franchise history.

On December 16, 2020, the league announced that it had merged with its competitor, Premier Lacrosse League.

== Transactions ==
=== Player movement ===
- On February 21, 2020, the Boston Cannons acquire attackman Bryce Wasserman from the Connecticut Hammerheads in exchange for attackman Will Sands.
- On February 21, the Boston Cannons acquire attackman Randy Staats and midfielder Bryan Cole from the Philadelphia Barrage in exchange for long stick midfielder PT Ricci and three picks in the 2020 collegiate draft (one second round, two third round).
- On February 26, the Philadelphia Barrage acquire attackman Kyle Marr from the Denver Outlaws in exchange for the Barrage's fifth round collegiate draft picks in 2020 in 2021.
- On February 27, the Philadelphia Barrage acquire midfielder Tim Barber from the Denver Outlaws in exchange for midfielder Kyle Jackson.
- On March 4, the Boston Cannons acquire long stick midfielder Corcoran from the New York Lizards in exchange for attackman Connor O'Hara.
- On March 5, the Denver Outlaws acquire midfielder Brian Kormondy from the Connecticut Hammerheads in exchange for a fourth round draft pick in the 2020 collegiate draft pick.
- On March 12, the Boston Cannons acquire long stick midfielder Matt Gilray in exchange for attackman James Burr and a seventh round draft pick in the 2020 collegiate draft.
- On April 8, the Chesapeake Bayhawks sign attackman Callum Crawford after a two-year hiatus in Major League Lacrosse. Crawford last played in 2017 for the Atlanta Blaze.

=== Coaching changes ===
Coaching changes
Team	2019 season	2020 season
Atlanta Blaze/ Philadelphia Barrage	Liam Banks	Spencer Ford
Chesapeake Bayhawks	Dave Cottle	Tom Mariano

- On January 16, 2020, shortly after the league announced it would be transitioning from a franchise model to a single-entity structure, Dave Cottle stepped down as head coach of the Bayhawks. He was replaced by assistant Tom Mariano, who also spent time as head coach for the Florida Launch.
- On February 17, 2020, Spencer Ford was named as head coach for the Philadelphia Barrage, after most of the disbanded Atlanta Blaze players and team staff were transferred to the Barrage reincarnation. Ford most recently served as general manager for the Blaze, and Liam Banks, who coached the Blaze to their first playoff berth in franchise history in 2019, elected not to make the move to Philly.

== Broadcast ==
Shortly after the league informed fans of its plans for a shortened season, it was announced that all 18 games would be broadcast on the ESPN family of networks. Two regular season games were aired on ESPN2 on July 19 while the championship game on July 26 aired on ESPN's flagship station. All other games would stream on ESPN+ and would be available to over 100 countries via ESPN Player. Canadian viewers were able to watch every game via TSN.

== Teams ==
Boston Cannons	Chesapeake Bayhawks	Connecticut Hammerheads
Veterans Memorial Stadium	Navy–Marine Corps Memorial Stadium	Rafferty Stadium
Capacity: 5,000	Capacity: 34,000	Capacity: 3,500

Locations of Major League Lacrosse teams for the 2020 season.

Denver Outlaws	New York Lizards	Philadelphia Barrage
Empower Field at Mile High	James M. Shuart Stadium	TBA
Capacity: 76,125	Capacity: 11,929	Capacity:

== Standings ==
2020 Major League Lacrosse Standings
	W	L	PCT	GB	GF	2ptGF	GA	2ptGA
Denver Outlaws	4	1	.800	-	66	0	48	1
Connecticut Hammerheads	3	2	.600	1	51	0	57	0
Chesapeake Bayhawks	3	2	.600	1	67	3	63	1
Boston Cannons	3	2	.600	1	57	2	58	0
Philadelphia Barrage	2	3	.400	2	57	0	64	0
New York Lizards	0	5	.000	4	57	0	65	3

Playoff Seed

== Collegiate Draft ==
Due to the COVID-19 pandemic, a virtual draft was held on May 4, consisting of eight rounds and 48 total picks. The New York Lizards selected faceoff specialist TD Ierlan with the first overall pick. However the next day, Ierlan announced he would be returning to Yale in 2021 after the pandemic-shortened 2020 NCAA season. Second overall pick, Michael Kraus, an attack from Virginia, signed a two-year contract with the Connecticut Hammerheads on May 14.

== Playoffs ==
After positive COVID-19 test results among players, the Connecticut Hammerheads (second seed) and Chesapeake Bayhawks (third seed) backed out of the postseason.

Championship; July 26; Navy-Marine Corps Memorial Stadium
4	Boston	13
1	Denver	10
