= Paul Rabil =

American lacrosse player (born 1985)

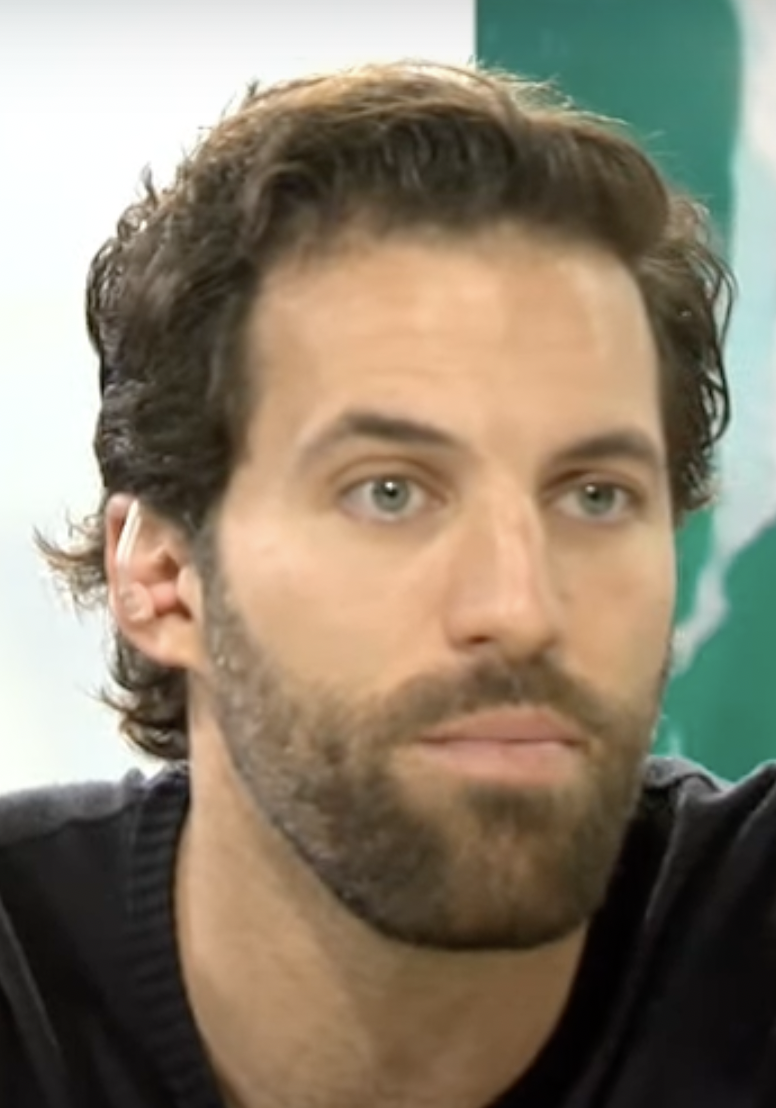
- Rabil in 2023

Personal information
- Born: December 14, 1985 (age 40) Gaithersburg, Maryland, U.S.
- Height: 6 ft 3 in (191 cm)
- Weight: 220 lb (100 kg; 15 st 10 lb)
- Website: www.paulrabil.com

Sport
- Position: Midfielder
- Shoots: Right
- NCAA team: Johns Hopkins
- NLL draft: 2nd overall, 2008; San Jose Stealth
- NLL teams: San Jose Stealth; Washington Stealth; Philadelphia Wings
- MLL draft: 1st overall, 2008; Boston Cannons
- MLL teams: Boston Cannons; New York Lizards
- PLL teams: Atlas Lacrosse Club; Cannons Lacrosse Club
- Pro career: 2008–2022
Medal record
Representing United States
Men's lacrosse
World Lacrosse Championship
Winner	2010 Manchester
Winner	2018 Netanya
Runner-up	2014 Denver
World Indoor Lacrosse Championship
Third place	2011 Prague

Paul Rabil (born December 14, 1985) is an American sports executive and retired professional lacrosse player. He is the president of the Premier Lacrosse League (PLL), which he co-founded with his brother, league CEO Mike Rabil.

Rabil played collegiate lacrosse at Johns Hopkins University. He won All-America honors all four years and holds the record for most playoff goals, assists, and points. He won two championships in 2005 and 2007. In 2007, he won the McLaughlin Award as the nation's best midfielder, and was inducted into the Johns Hopkins Athletics Hall of Fame in 2022.

Rabil played professional lacrosse in Major League Lacrosse (MLL) for eleven years from 2008 to 2018, when he cofounded the PLL. He played in the PLL for three years, from 2019 to 2021. He won the MLL Offensive Player of the Year Award three times, in 2009, 2011 and 2012, and the MLL MVP Award twice, in 2009 and 2011. He won the MLL Championship twice, in 2011 and in 2015. In 2021, he was 1st team all-pro. Rabil holds the record for second-most career points in professional lacrosse, scoring 657 points seasons across 14 seasons.

Rabil is considered one of the greatest lacrosse players of all time.

== Early life ==
Paul Rabil was born on December 14, 1985, in Gaithersburg, Maryland, to Allan and Jean Anne Rabil, his mother was a Catholic school art teacher; his father, who worked in sales for a printing company, encouraged his son to try many sports. He is of Lebanese descent through his great-grandfather. He grew up in Montgomery Village and completed his education at a local public school. During his childhood, Rabil pursued a variety of interests and extracurricular activities. Along with playing basketball, soccer, and swimming, he inclined toward music and learned to play several musical instruments. Rabil's mother insisted that he stick with lacrosse, and he fell in love with the game. Throughout his elementary and middle school years he continued playing lacrosse.

=== High school ===
At Watkins Mill High School, Rabil secured a spot as a starting player on the varsity team during his freshman year. Attracting interest from several local private high schools, Rabil transferred to DeMatha Catholic High School in Hyattsville, Maryland after participating in a summer tournament with the school's team. During Rabil's three-year tenure at Dematha, he led the team to three Washington Catholic Athletic Conference (WCAC) championships and a record of 49–16. Rabil amassed 288 career total points, including 80 goals and 73 assists in his two final seasons. Rabil was also awarded for his efforts as he was named 2-time All-American, 2-time All-State selection, and the #4 ranked prospect in the high school class of 2004. Following attention from lacrosse programs nationwide, Rabil ultimately chose to commit to Johns Hopkins University, attributing his decision to the exceptional leadership of Coach Dave Pietramala, as well as the program's legacy of championships and culture.

== College career ==
Rabil began his academic career at Johns Hopkins University in the Fall of 2004. Attending a prestigious university and keeping up with the educational course load was an initial struggle for Rabil. Rabil has a condition called auditory processing disorder, which makes it more difficult for individuals to process auditory information. Despite his struggles in the classroom, Rabil's Johns Hopkins lacrosse career began in the spring of 2005. In 2005, Rabil had a notable freshman season, tallying 37 points on 23 goals and 14 assists. This effort earned Rabil Third Team All-American honors and aided in securing Johns Hopkins the national championship. Rabil continued his successful start in 2006 during his sophomore season, scoring 25 goals and 13 assists. Rabil earned First Team All-American Honors, as well as being a finalist for the 2006 Tewaaraton Award. Despite Rabil's efforts, Johns Hopkins lost to Syracuse in the quarterfinals of the NCAA tournament.

As an upperclassman, Rabil tallied 27 goals and 26 assists for a total of 53 points in his junior season. Rabil was awarded First Team All-American honors for the second consecutive year, the McLaughlin Award, and was a finalist for the Tewaaraton Award. Rabil led the program to its ninth national title, defeating Duke University 12–11 in the National Championship game. In his senior season, Rabil scored 36 goals and had 14 assists for 50 total points. Rabil earned First Team All-American Honors for the third consecutive season, but missed out on another title as Johns Hopkins lost to Syracuse in the 2008 National Championship game. Ultimately, Rabil graduated from Johns Hopkins University in 2008 majoring in political science and minoring in entrepreneurship and management.

== Professional career ==
=== Major League Lacrosse ===
Rabil was selected 1st overall by the Boston Cannons in the 2008 Major League Lacrosse Collegiate Draft. In Rabil's Rookie season of 2008, Rabil participated in the MLL All-Star Game after immediately making an impact on the Cannons' offense. In 2009, Rabil added an MLL MVP and MLL Offensive Player of the Year, as well as participating in his second consecutive MLL All-Star Game. In Rabil's third season in 2010, he made his third consecutive All-Star Game, while being named a member of the First Team All-Pro MLL Team. Rabil earned the MLL MVP and MLL Offensive Player of the Year for the second time in his career in 2011, while leading Cannon's to their first MLL championship in franchise history in the 2011 season.

In 2012 during Rabil's sixth professional season, he broke the all-time points record at 72 points in a season. In doing this, Paul earned his third overall and second consecutive MLL Offensive Player of the Year. In 2014, Rabil continued his success adding his seventh consecutive All-Star game and sixth consecutive MLL All-Pro First Team Selection. In 2015, Rabil was traded to the New York Lizards in a package deal that included Cannon's midfielder Mike Stone for Max Seibal and MLL Collegiate Draft Picks. Rabil finished the remainder of his career in the MLL with the New York Lizards. With the New York Lizards, he won his second and final MLL championship in 2015, where he was named the playoff's MVP. Rabil left the MLL in 2018 to found the Premier Lacrosse League with his brother, Mike.

=== National Lacrosse League ===
Rabil also participated in the NLL, after being drafted second overall in the 2008 National Lacrosse League entry draft by San Jose Stealth. Scoring 16 goals and 18 assists for a total of 34 points, Paul was named to the 2009 All-Rookie Team in his initial season. In 2009, the San Jose Stealth moved to Washington State, becoming the Washington Stealth. In 2010, Rabil scored 11 goals and had 26 assists leading the Washington Stealth to an NLL Championship. In 2012, Rabil was eventually traded to the Edmonton Rush for Athan Ianucci. However, Rabil wished to move closer to his home in Maryland, therefore, did not report to Edmonton and sat out the rest of the 2012 NLL Season. Rabil was then traded to the Rochester Knighthawks in exchange for Jarret Davice, however, again did not report to training. Soon after, he was traded to the Philadelphia Wings for Dan Dawson, Paul Dawson, and a first-round draft pick. In 2013, Rabil played his last and final season in the NLL with the Philadelphia Wings scoring 17 goals and having 21 assists for a total of 38 points.

=== Premier Lacrosse League ===
Rabil co-founded the PLL in 2018 with his brother Mike Rabil. At the time of inception, the league was funded and backed by an investment group consisting of Joe Tsai Sports, The Chernin Group, Arctos Partners, Brett Jefferson Holdings, The Raine Group, and other sports investing groups. The Rabil brothers created the league with the hopes of pushing for higher wages and benefits for lacrosse players. At that time, Paul was among the handful of players who could earn a decent income through lacrosse, thanks to his social media following and several endorsement deals. Nonetheless, the Rabil brothers aspired to empower lacrosse players to turn the game into a viable profession and pursue it as a full-time career.

The league's first season began on June 1, 2019, with 6 teams taking part in the league. As well as being the founder of the league, Paul Rabil began his playing career in the PLL with Atlas Lacrosse Club. Rabil was traded to the Boston Cannons in 2021 alongside a sixth overall pick in the 2021 Entry Draft in exchange for a ninth overall pick in the 2021 Entry Draft, the eighth overall pick in the 2021 College Draft, and a first-round pick in the 2022 College Draft. Rabil finished his final season of play with the Boston Cannon in 2021 as he retired from the PLL after the season. Rabil attributed his retirement as a player to his desire to focus on the business side of the PLL and to continue building the league as well as his numerous other business ventures.

== Business ventures ==
Rabil founded Rabil Ventures in 2016 with his brother, Mike Rabil, and David Acker. Rabil Ventures focuses on providing capital, advisory, and active operating expertise to the companies in which they invest. The company invests in companies across a variety of sizes and industries, focusing on entrepreneurial companies in the sports, financial services, real estate, and health and wellness industries. Headquartered in San Francisco, California, the company currently has 30 companies within its portfolio having managed 38 companies total throughout its life span.

Rabil founded Rabil Companies in 2008. Headquartered in Baltimore, Maryland, the company has around ten employees. Rabil Companies is committed to advancing the sport of lacrosse in an authentic and socially impactful manner. These goals are achieved through three primary strategies: creating exceptional lacrosse experiences for young players that prioritize player development, competition, and thought leadership; reducing barriers to entry, particularly in terms of socioeconomic status and skill level; and producing high-quality content that showcases the organization's story and the individuals who have dedicated themselves to the sport. Rabil Companies involves Rabil's various ventures in order to grow the game of lacrosse. Some of Rabil's projects under Rabil Companies include The Paul Rabil Experience and Project Nine lacrosse training. As of November 2024, Rabil co-founded the Women's Lacrosse League (WLL) which was the organizations first major investment into the women's game. The league consists of four teams and follows the "Sixes" format that we will see in the 2028 LA Olympics.

== Philanthropic work ==
Rabil started the Paul Rabil Foundation in 2011 with his brother, Mike, his mother, Jean Anne, and his father, Allan. The foundation was created by Rabil with the purpose of aiding children with learning disabilities, as Paul suffered from Attention deficit hyperactivity disorder (ADHD) and auditory processing disorder as a child. The Paul Rabil Foundation creates various sports and academic programs to aid children with learning differences to overcome their difficulties inside the classroom. On the academic front, the foundation has contributed scholarships to students with learning differences since 2011. The foundation also focuses on aiding learning through sports and activities. The Paul Rabil Foundation has donated equipment to local public schools, as well as forming lacrosse programs at different schools in New York, Washington, DC, Maryland, Virginia, and Massachusetts.

Working alongside the PLL's mission to continue to grow the game of lacrosse, Rabil noticed that many neighborhood and public parks typically include basketball courts, baseball fields, and soccer goals. In order to grow the game of lacrosse, Rabil wants to donate goals to different parks in all 50 states, every year. In doing this, Rabil is attempting to mitigate the barriers of entry to play the game of lacrosse and increase overall access to the game.

== Filmography ==
In 2022 Rabil and his brother Mike Rabil, starred in Fate of a Sport, a Disney ESPN Film documentary, directed by Michael Doneger, and produced by Matt Tolmach and Michael Doneger.

== Books ==
Rabil is the author of the 2024 book The Way of the Champion: Pain, Persistence, and the Path Forward, a guide to embodying a champion's mindset in sports, business and relationships.

== Personal life ==
Rabil was previously married to former lacrosse player, Kelly Berger, from 2014 to 2017. Since 2022, he has been in a relationship with British actress Vanessa Kirby.

== Statistics ==
Rabil previously held the record for the world's fastest lacrosse shot at 111 mph. This was later broken by Zak Dorn at a competition in 2014.

== Awards ==
Rabil was inducted into the 2025 Pro Lacrosse Hall of Fame class. He was also inducted into the USA Lacrosse Hall of Fame in January 2025.

=== PLL ===
Season	Team	Regular season											Playoffs										
Season	Team	GP	G	2PG	A	Pts	Sh	GB	Pen	PIM	FOW	FOA	GP	G	2PG	A	Pts	Sh	GB	Pen	PIM	FOW	FOA
2019	Atlas	10	11	1	11	23	47	8	0	2	0	0	2	2	0	2	4	13	1	1	0	0	0
2020	Atlas	5	1	0	4	5	19	3	1	0	0	0	–	–	–	–	–	–	–	–	–	–	–
2021	Cannons	9	18	2	6	26	50	9	0	0	0	0	1	1	1	1	3	8	0	0	0	0	0
		24	30	3	21	54	116	20	1	2	0	0	3	3	1	3	7	21	1	1	0	0	0
Career total:		27	33	4	24	61	137	21	2	2	0	0											

GP–Games played; G–Goals; 2PG–2-point goals; A–Assists; Pts–Points; Sh–Shots; GB–Ground balls; Pen–Penalties; PIM–Penalty minutes; FOW–Faceoffs won; FOA–Faceoffs attempted

=== NLL ===
Paul Rabil		Regular season									Playoffs								
Season	Team	GP	G	A	Pts	LB	PIM	Pts/GP	LB/GP	PIM/GP	GP	G	A	Pts	LB	PIM	Pts/GP	LB/GP	PIM/GP
2009	San Jose Stealth	16	16	18	34	60	6	2.13	3.75	0.38	2	1	2	3	10	7	1.50	5.00	3.50
2010	Washington Stealth	15	11	26	37	84	22	2.47	5.60	1.47	3	5	1	6	21	11	2.00	7.00	3.67
2011	Washington Stealth	16	14	30	44	153	36	2.75	9.56	2.25	3	2	6	8	19	0	2.67	6.33	0.00
2012	Washington Stealth	5	3	5	8	27	17	1.60	5.40	3.40	–	–	–	–	–	–	–	–	–
2013	Philadelphia Wings	16	17	21	38	60	18	2.38	3.75	1.13	1	0	1	1	6	2	1.00	6.00	2.00
		68	61	100	161	384	99	2.37	5.65	1.46	9	8	10	18	56	20	2.00	6.22	2.22
Career Total:		77	69	110	179	440	119	2.32	5.71	1.55									

GP–Games played; G–Goals; A–Assists; Pts–Points; LB–Loose balls; PIM–Penalty minutes; Pts/GP–Points per games played; LB/GP–Loose balls per games played; PIM/GP–Penalty minutes per games played.

=== MLL ===
Season	Team	GP	G	2ptG	A	Pts	GB	PIM
2008	Boston	9	24	3	7	34	21	5.5
2009	Boston	12	33	8	12	53	15	2.5
2010	Boston	10	21	6	10	37	9	6
2011	Boston	11	28	4	18	50	14	1.5
2012	Boston	14	27	7	38	72	20	2
2013	Boston	14	32	3	19	54	17	1
2014	Boston	11	20	1	33	54	17	3.5
2015	New York	12	29	3	20	52	8	2.5
2016	New York	14	43	6	23	72	26	2.5
2017	New York	14	26	3	19	48	15	4
2018	New York	12	29	2	14	45	9	2.5
MLL totals		134	312	46	213	571	171	33.5

=== NCAA ===
Season	Team	GP	G	A	Pts
2005	Johns Hopkins	16	23	14	37
2006	Johns Hopkins	14	25	13	38
2007	Johns Hopkins	16	27	26	53
2008	Johns Hopkins	16	36	14	50
College totals		62	112	67	178
