= Inside Lacrosse =

US lacrosse magazine and media outlet

- Vice president and editor-in-chief: Terry Foy
- Categories: Sports
- Frequency: 11 per year
- Format: Oversized glossy
- Publisher: Robert Carpenter
- Founder: Robert Carpenter
- Founded: 1996
- Company: American City Business Journals
- Country: United States
- Based in: Baltimore, Maryland
- Website: insidelacrosse.com
- ISSN: 1541-5007

Inside Lacrosse is a lacrosse media entity and ESPN affiliate. It includes many parts including a news website, an 11 times annual magazine, online video streaming, internet forums and an ESPN television show. The company is currently headquartered in Baltimore, Maryland.

== Properties ==
=== Inside Lacrosse Magazine ===
Currently published 11 times a year, the magazine is in an oversized glossy format, similar to Rolling Stone and ESPN The Magazine. The page count averages anywhere from 136 to 172 pages depending on the time of year and main topics of interest are the men's college and high school lacrosse. Also receiving coverage is Major League Lacrosse, the National Lacrosse League, and women's lacrosse. Of the 11 issues, the most popular is the recruiting issue, followed by the college season preview issues.

=== Inside Lacrosse TV ===
Inside Lacrosse TV is the name of both Inside Lacrosse's video streaming website and their ESPN television show. The television show is a one-hour special that usually occurs twice annually as season "preview" and "summary" shows before and after the college season.

=== The Lacrosse Forums ===
As of May 2009, The Lacrosse Forums (TLF) has over 50,000 registered users making it the largest online lacrosse forums.

=== IL Indoor ===
IL Indoor is a National Lacrosse League news blog. Formerly known as "NLL Insider", it was started in 2005 as a spinoff to Inside Lacrosse so that Inside Lacrosse could focus on field lacrosse while IL Indoor would focus on box lacrosse. It features its own forums similar to The Lacrosse Forums. Some of the writers are former NLL players including Teddy Jenner, Brian Shanahan, Marty O'Neill, and Tom Ryan.

==== IL Indoor Forums ====
IL Indoor also has its own distinct message board forum, IL Indoor Forums which focuses primarily on National Lacrosse League news and discussions. This message board began in 2000 and was originally known as the National Lacrosse League Message Board until Inside Lacrosse purchased and then renamed it. It is the premier website for fan-based NLL journalism and is the location for serious NLL fans, staffers, and players to share news, rumors, opinions, and ideas for improving both the sport of box lacrosse and the NLL. It also serves as a living repository of NLL history and as a resource for new NLL fans to learn about the league, its rules, and its history by searching past posts or interacting with long-time fans.

== History ==
The company was founded in 1996 by Robert Carpenter, a Duke lacrosse and Vestal, NY High School graduate. Knowing that fans cannot be truly invested in a sport if they don't have access to the news and the personalities surrounding it, Inside Lacrosse was born. A ham and egg operation run out of Carpenter's spare bedroom in Towson, Maryland was all about printing and sending weekly score bulletins to lacrosse junkies nationally, in first-class envelopes so nothing was out of date. The maiden issue was a 16-page black-and-white newspaper consisting mostly of box scores and stats. Among the content was the news of Michigan State and New Hampshire dropping their men's varsity programs and Syracuse's epic 22–21 win over Virginia.

In 2007, American City Business Journals acquired the magazine from Carpenter Publishing LLC. By 2008, Inside Lacrosse had expanded beyond print publishing into television programming and live collegiate lacrosse events. The publication had produced a one-hour television special for ESPN and was involved in organizing the Face-Off Classic, a college lacrosse events held at M&T Bank Stadium in Baltimore, Maryland.

== Events ==
Inside Lacrosse has organized collegiate lacrosse events. These include the Face-Off Classic and the Big City Classic. In 2009, the Face-Off classic was held at M&T Bank Stadium in Baltimore, while the inaugural Big City Classic took place at the Giants Stadium in East Rutherford, New Jersey. The Big City Class featured six college teams competing in three games on April 4, 2009. In 2010, Konica Minolta expanded its sponsorship of Inside Lacrosse events to include the Big City Classic as well as the Face-Off Classic.

== Rankings and Player Honors ==
Inside Lacrosse publishes national recruiting rankings for high school lacrosse players. These rankings include Top 100 lists for boys' and girls' recruiting classes. In September 2026, the publication released rankings for the Class of 2028, identifying the leading recruits. Inside Lacrosse also selects collegiate Media All-America teams recognizing individual players. Its 2026 men's lacrosse selections included first-team, second-team, third team, and honorable mention honors.

== Digital Media and Partnerships ==
In July 2026, Inside Lacrosse partnered with Yahoo Sports to provide coverage for a dedicated lacrosse section on the Yahoo Sports website. The section features written and video content from Inside Lacrosse alongside material from other lacrosse organizations, including the Premier Lacrosse League, Women's Lacrosse League, The Lacrosse Network and USA Lacrosse Magazine.

== Awards and honors ==
- 1998 – USILA Media Award
- 2003 – IWLCA Media Award
- 2003 – IWLCA Service Award
- 2005 – USILA Media Award
- 2008 – FOLIO: Magazine Eddie Award - Consumer, Sports, Full Issue
