= Eddie S. Henderson Stadium =

High school football stadium in Atlanta, Georgia

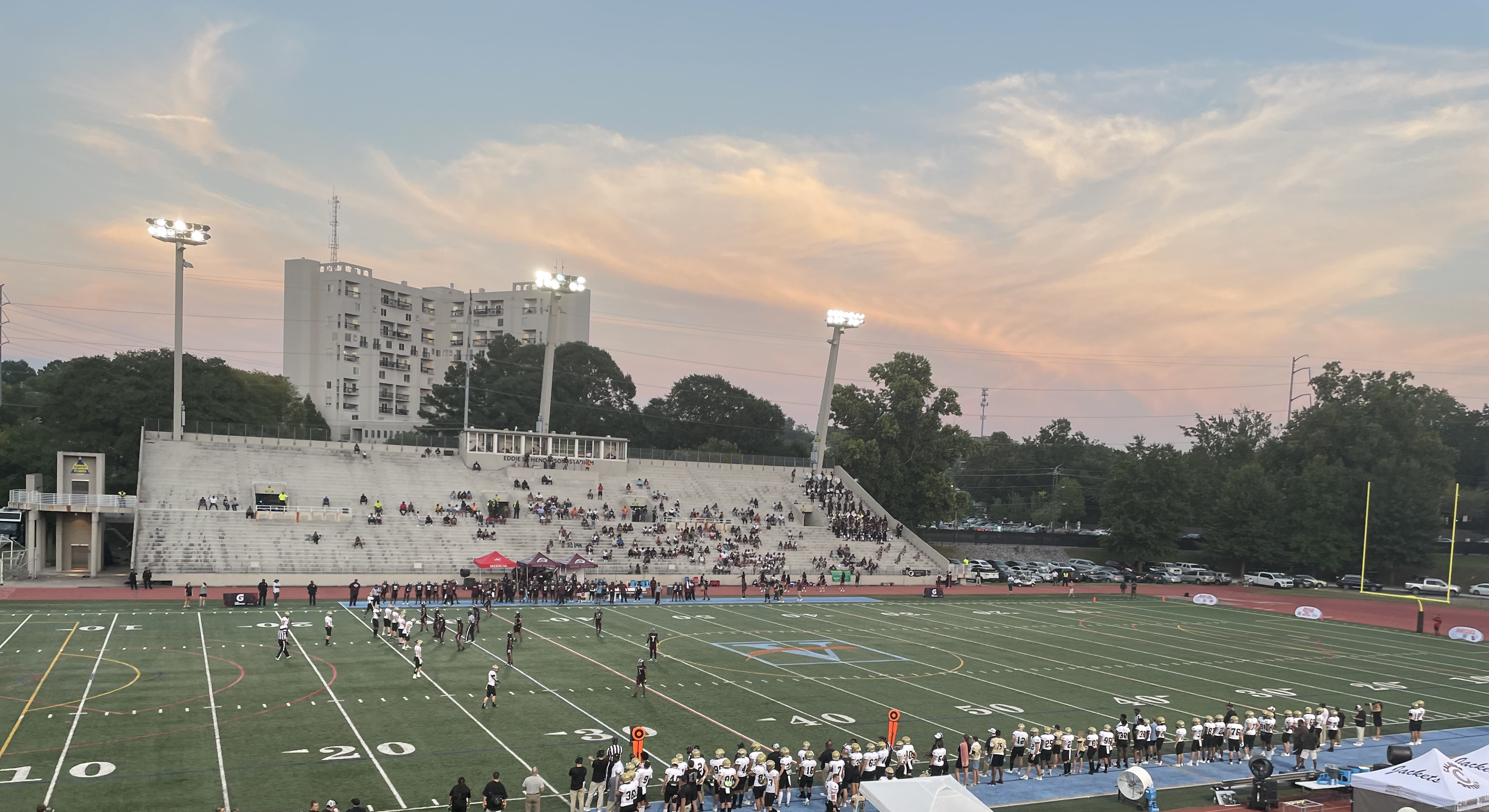
- Interactive map of Eddie S. Henderson Stadium
- Former names: Grady Stadium (1948–2020)
- Location: Monroe Drive & 10 St. Atlanta, Georgia 30309
- Coordinates: 33.7808°N 84.37°W
- Owner: Atlanta Public Schools
- Operator: Atlanta Public Schools
- Capacity: 8,000
- Surface: FieldTurf

Construction
- Opened: 1948
- Closed: Open
- Architect: Richard Aeck

Tenants
- Atlanta Public Schools; Atlanta Hustle (AUDL) (2015–present); Atlanta Blaze (MLL) (2019)

Eddie S. Henderson Stadium (formerly Grady Stadium) is an Atlanta Public School football stadium located in Midtown Atlanta, south of Piedmont Park. The stadium is one of two stadiums owned and managed by the Atlanta Public School (APS) system, the other being Lakewood Stadium. It is the only high school stadium in APS that is located on the campus of a high school. The stadium was used as a training site for athletes during the 1996 Olympic Games, and occasionally hosts public practices for the Atlanta Falcons. Henderson Stadium was designed by Richard Aeck, and is considered a masterpiece of modern engineering expression. For the fall of 2009, Henderson Stadium was closed due to renovation. All games were played at Lakewood Stadium and the Georgia Dome.

The renovation was completed during Summer of 2010. A new running track and synthetic turf field was installed. The synthetic turf is FieldTurf. FieldTurf is also installed at Lakewood Stadium, the former Georgia Dome, Mercedes-Benz Stadium, and many other high-profile sports facilities worldwide.

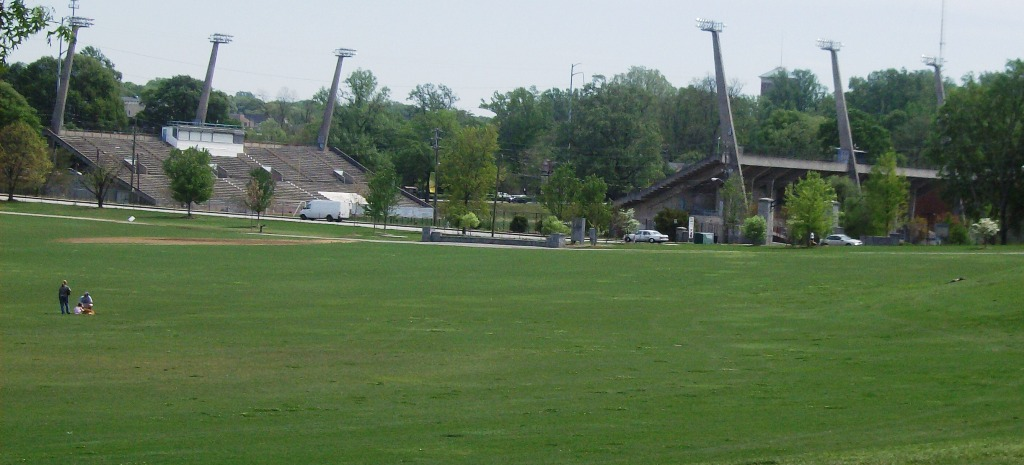
Eddie S. Henderson Stadium in 2006

In February 2021, the APS board unanimously approved renaming the stadium after Eddie S. Henderson, a former coach, principal, and athletics director for APS.
