= Veterans Memorial Stadium (Quincy, Massachusetts) =

Multi-purpose sports stadium

Coordinates: 42°15′40″N 71°00′36″W

- Interactive map of Veterans Memorial Stadium
- Former names: Quincy Municipal Stadium
- Location: 850 Hancock Street; Quincy, Massachusetts, U.S.
- Owner: City of Quincy
- Operator: Heritage Sports Ventures
- Capacity: 5,000
- Scoreboard: Daktronics

Construction
- Groundbreaking: 1937
- Opened: 1938; 88 years ago

Tenants
- Quincy High School Football (1932–2017, 2019–present) (Note: Due to the renovations during the 2018–19 school year, Quincy High's home field was moved to North Quincy's Creedon Field for the season.); North Quincy High School Football (1932–present); Boston Minutemen (NASL) (1976); Eastern Nazarene College Soccer (NCAA DIII) (2007–present); Boston Rams (PDL) (2014); Boston Cannons (MLL) (2019); New England Free Jacks (MLR) (2021–present); Boston Banshees (WER) (2025–present)

Veterans Memorial Stadium is a multipurpose outdoor stadium in Quincy, Massachusetts. Built from 1937 to 1938 under the Works Progress Administration, it seats 5,000 spectators for football, soccer, Rugby union and lacrosse. It is the home field of Quincy High School athletics, namely football and soccer, and the New England Free Jacks of Major League Rugby. The grounds have most notably held the annual intracity Thanksgiving Day Game between QHS and NQHS, dubbed by SI.com as one of the best in America, since 1932.

The land the stadium sits on is part of Merrymount Park, which's was gifted to the city by the Adams family. The current stadium replaced a prior athletic field that was known as Pfaffman's Oval, a cinder dirt track with a large embankment on one side, which made for a natural amphitheater for spectators. After several attempts to fund the stadium failed, ground was broken in January, 1937. The stadium was opened on September 25, 1938, in a ceremony attended by Senator Henry Cabot Lodge.

Throughout the 1960s, the Boston Patriots played several preseason intra-squad scrimmages for charity at the stadium.

In 1976 it served as a home stadium for the Boston Minutemen of the North American Soccer League.

The stadium underwent a $1.2 million renovation in 2006, including accessibility improvements and new synthetic turf as well as making the stadium usable as a lacrosse, rugby and soccer field, and another $1.5 million renovation in 2018, replacing bleacher seats with chair back seats, adding extra capacity and a large electronic video board.

The stadium served as the home of the Boston Cannons of Major League Lacrosse for the 2019 season. Due to COVID, the team played the entire shortened 2020 season behind closed doors at Navy–Marine Corps Memorial Stadium in Annapolis, Maryland, in which they would win the championship. The team was then absorbed by the barnstorming Premier Lacrosse League, for which a home stadium was no longer necessary.

On June 28, 2021, the New England Free Jacks of Major League Rugby announced they were moving into the stadium starting with the final game of the 2021 MLR season.

The stadium has been used since 2021 for the Massachusetts Instrumental and Choral Conductors Association State Finals for marching band.

== Notable events ==
=== Rugby ===
Date	Visiting Team	Score	Home Team	Match Type	Attendance	Notes
June 19, 2022	Rugby New York	24–16	New England Free Jacks	2022 MLR; Eastern Conference Final	3,500	
July 1, 2023	Old Glory DC	7–25	New England Free Jacks	2023 MLR; Eastern Conference Final	3,414	
July 26, 2023	Canada Women's U23	24–5	USA Women's U23	Border Battle		
July 30, 2023	Canada Women's U23	55–14	USA Women's U23	Border Battle		
July 20, 2024	Old Glory DC	29–33	New England Free Jacks	2024 MLR; Eastern Conference Semifinals		
July 27, 2024	Chicago Hounds	17–23	New England Free Jacks	2024 MLR; Eastern Conference Finals		
June 15, 2025	Miami Sharks	10–32	New England Free Jacks	2025 MLR; Eastern Conference Semifinals		
June 21, 2025	Chicago Hounds	20–21	New England Free Jacks	2025 MLR; Eastern Conference Finals		
