= New York Lizards =

Field lacrosse team in the MLL

- Sport: Lacrosse
- Founded: 2001
- Folded: 2020
- League: MLL
- Based in: Hempstead, New York
- Stadium: Shuart Stadium
- Colors: Green, White, Black
- Owner: Medallion Sports Group
- Chairman: Jeffrey Rudnick
- Head coach: BJ O'Hara
- General manager: Joe Spallina
- League titles: 3 (2001, 2003, 2015)
- Division titles: 4 (2001, 2002, 2003, 2005)
- Local media: Newsday
- Website: nylizards.com

The New York Lizards, originally the Long Island Lizards, were a Major League Lacrosse (MLL) team based in Hempstead, New York, located on Long Island. They are original members of the MLL. They lost the league's inaugural game on June 7, 2001 to the Baltimore Bayhawks (now Chesapeake Bayhawks), 16–13.

== History ==
In the MLL's inaugural season in 2001, the Long Island Lizards split their home games between Hofstra Stadium, now James M. Shuart Stadium, and EAB Park (now Bethpage Ballpark). For the 2002 season, they used Hofstra Stadium as their home field. As of 2003, the Lizards played all home contests at Mitchel Athletic Complex, in Uniondale, New York until 2008. The team returned to James M. Shuart Stadium for their home games in 2009. The Lizards have won American Division championships in 2001, 2002, and 2003, and Major League Lacrosse titles in 2001, 2003 and 2015. The team made the playoffs in 2005 as a wildcard despite a losing record. The team's name and logo are based on the Italian wall lizard, a small reptile that was imported to Long Island (which has no native lizards) in the 1960s and which populate areas of the team's hometown of Hempstead in Nassau County. On December 14, 2012, the Lizards changed their name to the New York Lizards.

Prior to the 2015 season, the Lizards made a trade with the Boston Cannons for Paul Rabil. In exchange for Paul Rabil and Mike Stone, the Cannons received Max Seibald, Brian Karalunas and three draft picks. That season, the Lizards won their third Steinfeld Cup and first in 12 years by defeating their instate rival Rochester Rattlers 15–12. The Lizards won the game at Fifth Third Bank Stadium in Atlanta, Georgia before a Steinfeld Cup-record 8,674 fans.

Prior to the 2019 season, Rabil and his brother Michael formed the Premier Lacrosse League, which would compete directly with Major League Lacrosse and lead to an attrition in talent. In the Lizards' first season after the pro lacrosse landscape changed vastly, they lost a franchise worst 11 games in 2019, and posted their second-worst winning percentage (.313). In 2020, a week-long, quarantined tournament thanks to the COVID-19 pandemic, the Lizards joined the 2006 Chicago Machine as the only two teams in league history to post a winless season.

== Rivalry ==
Chesapeake Bayhawks

The Lizards' main rival were the Chesapeake Bayhawks. Between them, they hold 8 of the 15 MLL league championships awarded through the 2015 season. The two teams have played in the championship game five times, with Chesapeake winning 3 of those 5.

Boston Cannons

The Lizards have found a new rival in the Boston Cannons after they traded their All Star Mid Fielder Paul Rabil to New York in January 2015. That season the Lizards faced the Cannons in the MLL semi-finals and the game resulted in a dramatic overtime victory for the Lizards(16-15). The tension of that game continued into the 2016 MLL season when the Cannons came to James M. Shuart Stadium, which resulted in another intense over-time victory for the Lizards(13-12).

== General managers ==
- Joe Spallina was the head coach and general manager of the New York Lizards.

== Coaching staff ==
=== Current coaching staff ===
- Head coach – BJ O'Hara
- Assistant coach – Ted Garber
- Assistant coach – Mike Gongas

=== All-time head coaches ===
| # | Name | Term | Regular season | | | | Playoffs | | | |
| # | Name | Term | GC | W | L | W% | GC | W | L | W% |
|---|---|---|---|---|---|---|---|---|---|---|
| 1 | John Detommaso | 2001–2004 | 51 | 33 | 18 | .647 | 6 | 5 | 1 | .833 |
| 2 | Jim Mule | 2005–2011 | 84 | 37 | 47 | .440 | 5 | 2 | 3 | .400 |
| 3 | Joe Spallina | 2012–2018 | 98 | 54 | 44 | .551 | 6 | 2 | 4 | .333 |
| 4 | B.J. O'Hara | 2019– | 21 | 5 | 16 | .238 | - | - | - | - |

== Most recent roster ==
2020 New York Lizards
| Number | Name | Nationality | Position | Height | Weight | College |
|---|---|---|---|---|---|---|
| 1 | Sean O'Brien | (United States) | M | 5 ft 10 in | 180 lbs | Bucknell |
| 4 | Dylan Molloy (C) | (United States) | A | 6 ft 1 in | 220 lbs | Brown |
| 5 | Nicky Galasso | (United States) | M | 6 ft 0 in | 185 lbs | Syracuse |
| 6 | Mark Andrejack | (United States) | FO | 5 ft 7 in | 175 lbs | Adelphi |
| 7 | Andrew Pettit | (United States) | A | 5 ft 11 in | 195 lbs | Lehigh |
| 11 | Justin Reh | (United States) | M | 6 ft 1 in | 185 lbs | Albany |
| 12 | Brian Corrigan | (United States) | G | 5 ft 11 in | 205 lbs | Marist |
| 14 | Austin Kaut (C) | (United States) | G | 5 ft 10 in | 200 lbs | Penn State |
| 15 | Steven Romano | (United States) | M | 6 ft 2 in | 200 lbs | Hofstra |
| 16 | Nick Aponte | (United States) | A | 6 ft 0 in | 190 lbs | Penn State |
| 17 | Thomas O'Connell | (Puerto Rico) | SSDM | 6 ft 2 in | 195 lbs | Maryland |
| 18 | Mike Mayer | (United States) | D | 6 ft 5 in | 215 lbs | Georgetown |
| 19 | Bobby Duvnjak | (Croatia) | D | 6 ft 3 in | 205 lbs | Harvard |
| 20 | Danny Dolan | (United States) | G | 6 ft 1 in | 180 lbs | Maryland |
| 22 | Brendan Kearns | (United States) | A | 6 ft 1 in | 195 lbs | Providence |
| 23 | Ian Kirby | (United States) | A | 6 ft 1 in | 170 lbs | Adelphi |
| 31 | Andrew Bracy | (United States) | FO | 5 ft 11 in | 196 lbs | Norwich |
| 34 | Mark Ellis | (United States) | SSDM | 5 ft 10 in | 188 lbs | Hofstra |
| 39 | Tommy Wright | (United States) | D | 6 ft 0 in | 190 lbs | Penn State |
| 42 | Colin Burke | (United States) | M | 6 ft 0 in | 175 lbs | Utah |
| 44 | Decker Curran | (United States) | M | 6 ft 3 in | 200 lbs | Michigan |
| 71 | Peter Welch | (United States) | D | 6 ft 2 in | 205 lbs | Duke |
| 77 | Ben Randall | (United States) | D | 6 ft 3 in | 210 lbs | Ohio State |
| 88 | Connor O'Hara | (United States) | A | 6 ft 0 in | 175 lbs | Bucknell |
| 90 | Jack Carrigan | (United States) | D | 6 ft 3 in | 220 lbs | Loyola |
| 92 | Alex Spring (C) | (United States) | D | 5 ft 11 in | 185 lbs | Bucknell |

(C)- captain

- As of 21 May 2020

== MLL Award winners ==
Most Valuable Player

- Jay Jalbert: 2003
- Greg Gurenlian: 2015
- Rob Pannell: 2018

Rookie of the Year

- Matt Gibson: 2012
- Rob Pannell: 2013

Coach of the Year

- John DeTommaso: 2001
- Jim Mule: 2010
- Joe Spallina: 2012

Offensive Player of the Year

- Rob Pannell: 2016, 2018

Defensive Player of the Year

- Nicky Polanco: 2005
- Joe Fletcher: 2015

Goalie of the Year

- Brian Dougherty: 2003
- Drew Adams: 2010, 2011, 2015

Most Improved Player

- Stephen Peyser: 2011

=== Retired numbers ===
- 2 – Greg Cattrano
- 9 – Tim Goettlemann
- 10 – Jay Jalbert
- 29 – Pat McCabe
- 21 – Brodie Thoms

== Season-by-season ==
Long Island Lizards
| Year | W | L | % | Regular season finish | Playoff results |
| 2001 | 10 | 4 | .714 | 1st in American Division | Won semifinal, 13–12, over Rattlers; Won championship, 15–11, over Bayhawks |
| 2002 | 9 | 5 | .643 | 1st in American Division | Won semifinal, 19–11, over Pride; Lost championship, 21–13, to Bayhawks |
| 2003* | 8 | 3 | .727 | 1st in American Division | Won semifinal, 20–14, over Cannons; Won championship, 15–14 (OT), over Bayhawks |
| 2004 | 6 | 6 | .500 | 3rd in American Division | — |
| 2005 | 4 | 8 | .333 | 2nd in American Division | Won semifinal 19–14 over Cannons; Lost championship, 15–9, to Bayhawks |
| 2006 | 5 | 7 | .417 | 4th in Eastern Conference | — |
| 2007 | 5 | 7 | .417 | 4th in Eastern Conference | — |
| 2008 | 5 | 7 | .417 | 5th in Eastern Conference | — |
| 2009 | 6 | 6 | .500 | 3rd Overall | Lost semifinal, 14–13, to Toronto Nationals |
| 2010 | 7 | 5 | .583 | 3rd Overall | Won semifinal, 16–12, over Denver Outlaws; Lost championship, 13–9, to Chesapeake Bayhawks |
| 2011 | 5 | 7 | .417 | 5th Overall | — |
| 2012 | 8 | 6 | .571 | 4th overall | Lost semifinal, 13–12, vs Outlaws |
New York Lizards
| 2013 | 4 | 10 | .286 | 7th overall | — |
| 2014 | 9 | 5 | .643 | 3rd overall | Lost semifinal, 14–13, to Outlaws |
| 2015 | 10 | 4 | .714 | 1st overall | Won semifinal, 16–15, over Boston Cannons; Won championship, 15–12, over Rochester Rattlers |
| 2016 | 8 | 6 | .571 | 2nd overall | Lost semifinal, 20–17, vs Denver Outlaws |
| 2017 | 7 | 7 | .500 | 5th overall | — |
| 2018 | 8 | 6 | .571 | 4th overall | Lost Semifinal, 15–12, vs. Dallas Rattlers |
| 2019 | 5 | 11 | .313 | 6th overall | - |
| 2020 | 0 | 5 | .000 | 6th overall | - |
| Totals | 129 | 125 | .508 | | Total playoff record 9–8; Playoff win % = .529 |

* August 17 game against Baltimore canceled due to rain

- 2001 Long Island Lizards season
- 2002 Long Island Lizards season
- 2003 Long Island Lizards season
- 2004 Long Island Lizards season
- 2005 Long Island Lizards season
- 2006 Long Island Lizards season
- 2007 Long Island Lizards season
- 2008 Long Island Lizards season
- 2009 Long Island Lizards season
- 2010 Long Island Lizards season
- 2011 Long Island Lizards season
- 2012 Long Island Lizards season
- 2013 New York Lizards Season
- 2017 New York Lizards season
- 2018 New York Lizards season
- 2019 New York Lizards season

== MLL collegiate draft history ==
=== First round selections ===
- 2001: Eric Wedin, Johns Hopkins (4th overall)
- 2002: None
- 2003: None
- 2004: None
- 2005: None
- 2006: None
- 2007: Matt McMonagle, Cornell (10th overall)
- 2008: None
- 2009: Zack Greer, Bryant (3rd overall)
- 2010: Peter McKee, Duke (4th overall)
- 2011: Zach Brenneman, Notre Dame (5th overall)
- 2012: Rob Pannell, Cornell (1st overall)
- 2013: None
- 2014: Joe Fletcher, Loyola (3rd overall); Luke Duprey, Duke (4th overall)
- 2015: None
- 2016: None
- 2017: None
- 2018: Joel Tinney, Johns Hopkins (5th overall)
- 2019: None
