= Mayer B. Davidson =

American physician and author

- Education: Swarthmore College; Harvard Medical School
- Occupations: Physician, author
- Employer(s): Charles R. Drew University of Medicine and Science; David Geffen School of Medicine at UCLA
- Known for: Expertise in diabetes; algorithmic insulin dosing

Mayer B. Davidson is an American physician and author who is an expert on diabetes and the algorithmic dosing of insulin. A professor of medicine at both the Charles R. Drew University of Medicine and Science and the David Geffen School of Medicine at UCLA, Davidson has studied algorithmic dosing of insulin as a means of controlling diabetes in insulin-using patients.

== Education ==
Davidson holds an AB in chemistry from Swarthmore College and a medical degree from Harvard Medical School.

== Career ==
In 1996 Davidson proposed that the level of a person's HbA1c—a measure of average blood glucose—could be used to diagnose diabetes mellitus. The American Diabetes Association and the World Health Organization agreed in 2010 and recommended its use for diagnosis.

Davidson is a past president of the American Diabetes Association, a past editor-in-chief of Diabetes Care and the founding editor of Current Diabetes Reports. He is the author of more than 170 scientific articles.

Wiley Medical Education published Davidson's first book, Diabetes Mellitus: Diagnosis and Treatment, in four editions beginning in 1981. Saunders (now Elsevier) published a fifth edition co-authored by Anne Peters Harmel and Ruchi Mathur, in 2003, renaming the book Davidson's Diabetes Mellitus: Diagnosis and Treatment. The American Diabetes Association published Meeting the American Diabetes Association Standards of Care: An Algorithmic Approach to Clinical Care of the Diabetes Patient in 2010. The title is in its second edition, published in 2017.

With Debra L. Gordon, Davidson wrote two editions of The Complete Idiot's Guide to Type 2 Diabetes.

In 1970 Philip Rossman and Mayer Davidson founded the Venice Family Clinic, a free clinic in the Venice neighborhood of Los Angeles. By the mid-1990s, it had grown to be the largest free medical clinic in the country. It is now a UCLA-affiliated community clinic with 12 locations.

He is now chief medical officer of Mellitus Health.
