= Teele =

Teele is a surname. Notable people with the surname include:

- Arthur Teele (1946–2005), American lawyer and politician
- Jack Teele (1930–2017), American football executive and sportswriter
- Stanley F. Teele (1906–1967), American academic administrator

== See also ==
- Peele
- Teege
- Teel
