= New Balance 2002 =

Line of shoes by New Balance

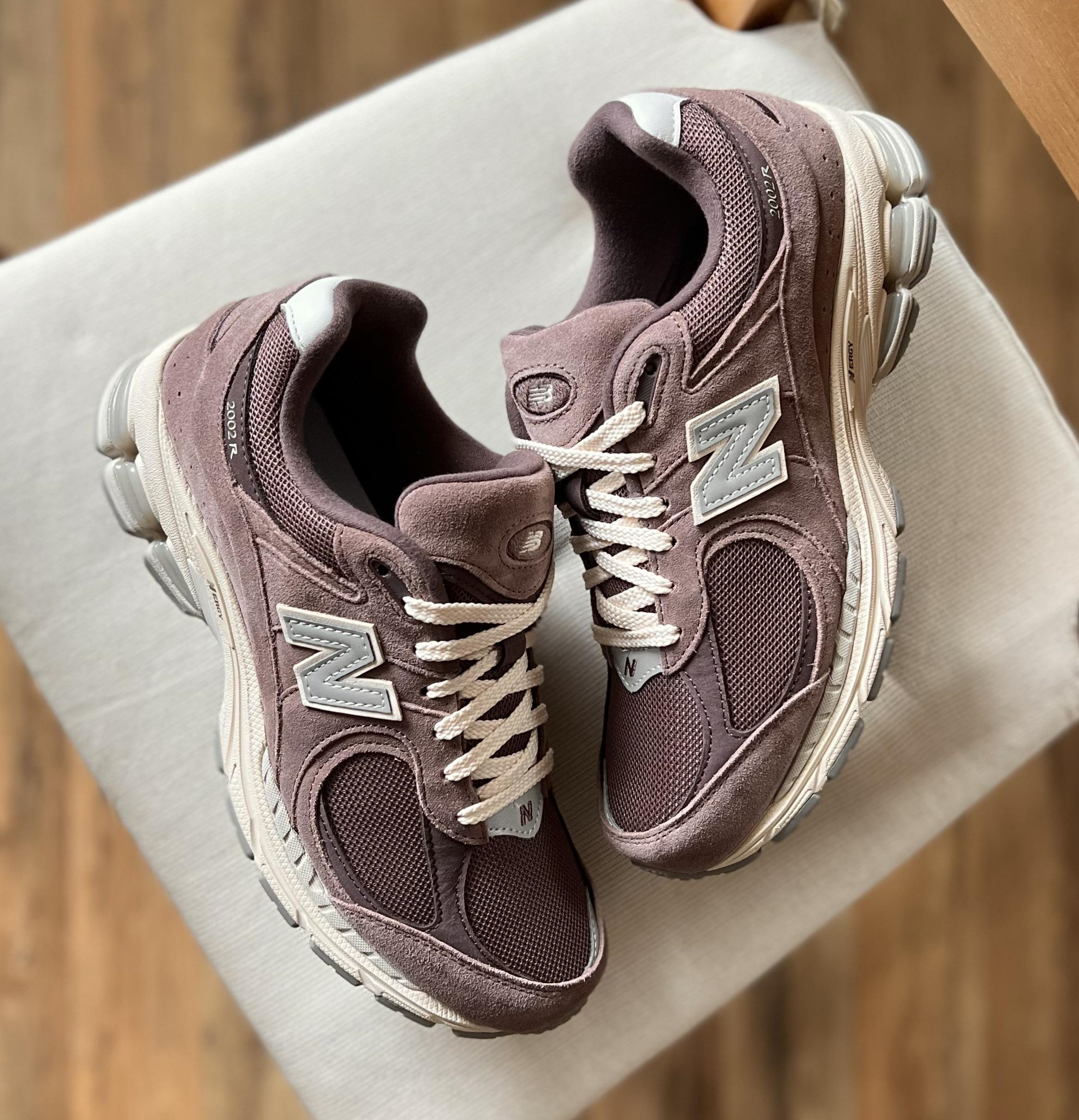
- A pair of New Balance 2002R sneakers
- Type: Sneakers
- Inventor: New Balance
- Inception: 2010; 16 years ago
- Manufacturer: New Balance
- Available: Yes

New Balance 2002 is a running shoe produced by New Balance.

== Overview ==
The company developed the 2002 as a high-performance running shoe and a successor to the New Balance 2001, part of the company's 1000 series of running shoes. The upper of the shoe is made of nubuck and mesh while the sole features the company's N-ERGY gel all along the shoe. The inspiration for design of the shoe, including the sole, came from a previous model, the New Balance 1906. The shoe was manufactured in the company's American factories and sold for a premium of $250 when it was released in 2010. Due to the high price, the shoe was not popular when it first launched.

In early 2018, a Japanese employee, Tetsuya Shono, was working on deciding which shoe from the company's catalogue to bring back for the second half of 2020. Shono knew how popular the model was in Japan and was also a fan of it himself. Hence, he decided it would be a good choice. He felt that the 2002 could support the New Balance 99X series by offering a different design to contrast it.

The shoe was re-introduced in 2020, its tenth anniversary, as the 2002R. The 2002R did not feature the same sole as the original because it did not exist anymore. As a result, the sole of the New Balance 860v2 was chosen to replace it. The shoe launched to some success but soon saw a lot popularity the following year due to collaborations with prominent designers.

== Models ==
=== 2002R ===
This model was introduced as a lifestyle sneaker. The shoe features the same design as the original, with the only difference being the sole, which it borrows from the 860V2.
