= New Balance 1906 =

Line of shoes by New Balance

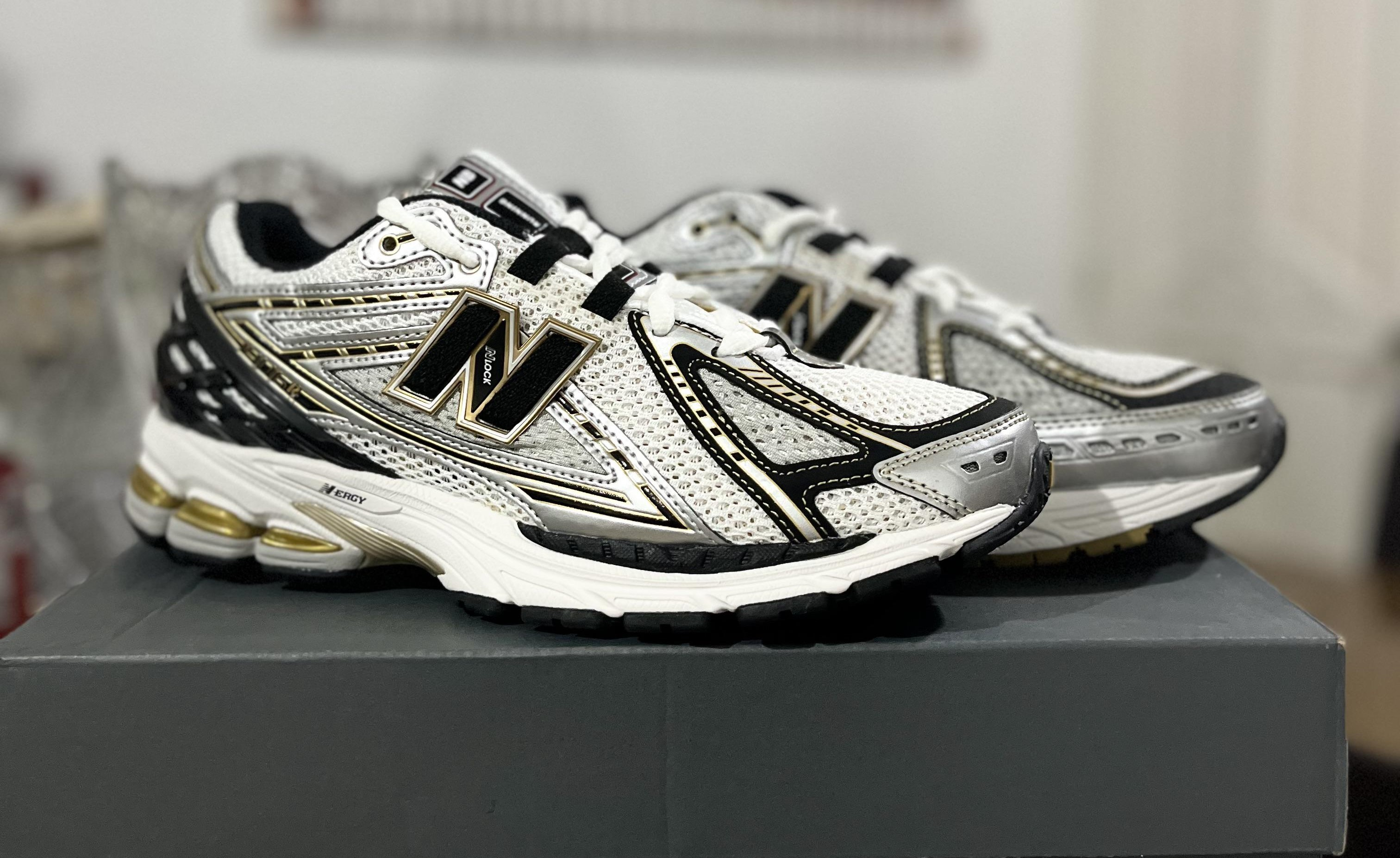
- A pair of New Balance 1906R sneakers
- Type: Sneakers
- Inventor: New Balance
- Inception: 2009; 17 years ago
- Manufacturer: New Balance
- Available: Yes

New Balance 1906 is a running shoe produced by New Balance.

== Overview ==
The shoe was developed as a running shoe and released in October 2009. The name comes from the year that the company was founded and is part of the 1000 series of running shoes. The shoe features the company's N-ERGY gel all along the sole while the upper is almost entirely made of mesh to ensure better breathability. The shoe also comes with NLOCK, the company's webbing system that helps tighten the shoe around the middle part of the foot when the shoes are tied.

The popularity of 2000s era running shoes in the early 2020s helped motivate New Balance to re-release the 1906 in 2022. Similar to the relaunch of the New Balance 2002, the sole of the shoe was replaced with that of the New Balance 860v2 and given the name 1906R. A coincidence as the 1906 served as a design inspiration for the 2002.

== Models ==
=== 1906R ===
The current version of the shoe that features the original, overall design with the sole being replaced with that of the 860V2.

=== 1906D ===
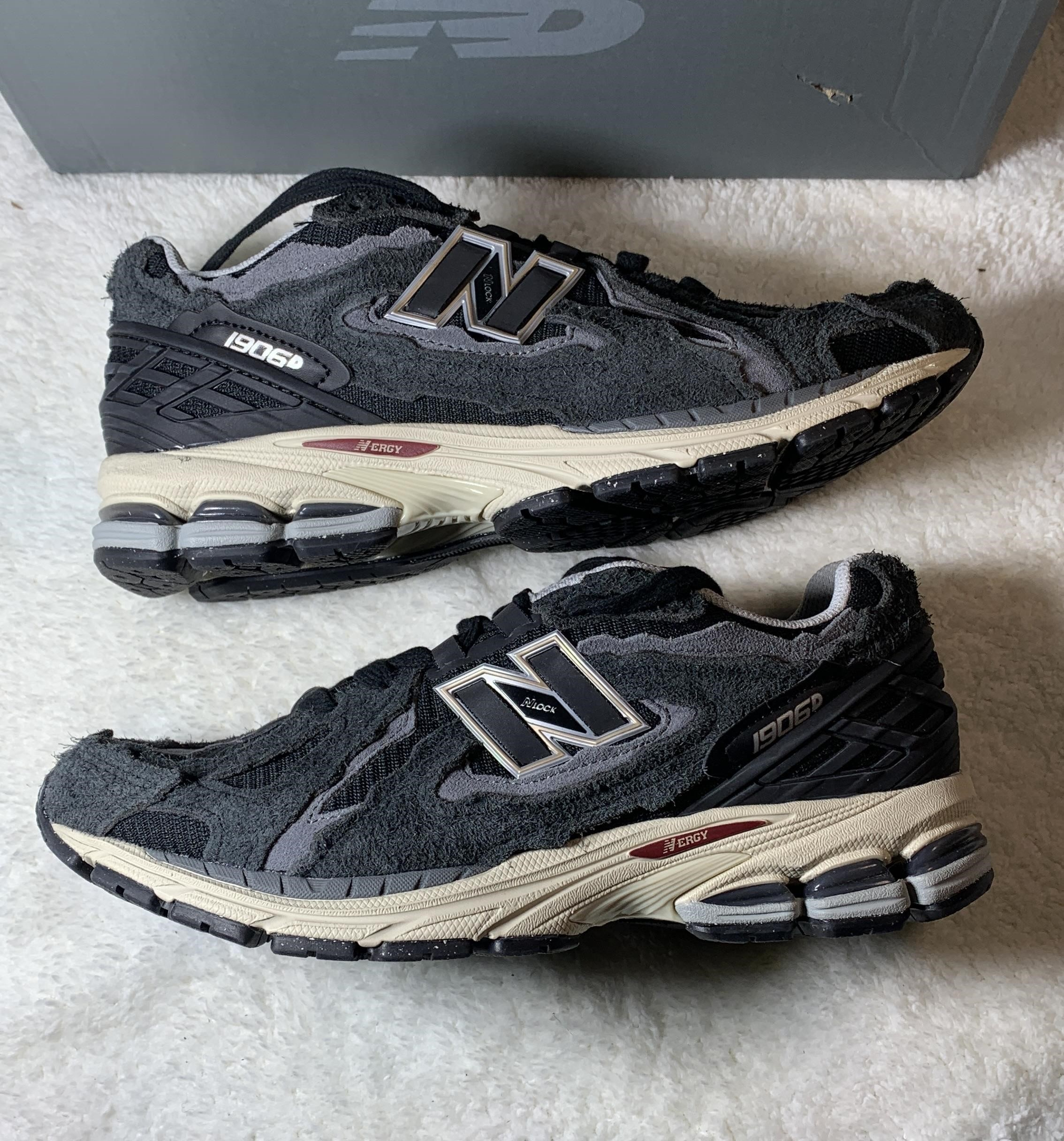
The 1906D in black.

Released in 2022, the sneakers are a collaboration with designer Yue Wu. They feature suede on the upper and a more jagged and worn out look to the shoes with tearing designs. The "D" in the name stands for "distressed".

=== 1906L ===
This "snoafer" is a combination of a sneaker and a loafer. It went viral in 2025, helping increase sales of loafers by 33% (men) and 28% (women) versus the third quarter of 2024.

=== 1906U ===
This model of the shoe is designed for a more trail running like design and features a more rugged look. It was released in 2024. The "U" in the name stands for "utility".
