= Bernard Briskin =

American businessman (1924–2020)

- Born: May 21, 1924
- Died: February 29, 2020
- Education: Black-Foxe Military Institute; Worcester Academy; Beverly Hills High School
- Alma mater: University of California, Los Angeles
- Occupation: Businessman
- Spouse: Judy Briskin
- Children: 8
- Parent: Samuel J. Briskin

Bernard Briskin (May 21, 1924 – February 29, 2020) was an American businessman, investor and philanthropist. He was the co-founder of Gelson's Markets, a supermarket chain in Southern California, and was its chairman until 2014.

== Early life ==
Bernard Briskin was born May 21, 1924. His father, Samuel J. Briskin, was a film producer and philanthropist.

Briskin was educated at the Black-Foxe Military Institute and Fairfax High School in Los Angeles, California, until he went to prep school in New England at Worcester Academy, and returned to the West coast, where he graduated from Beverly Hills High School in 1943. During World War II, he served at Marine Corps Base Camp Pendleton for 33 months. He graduated from the University of California, Los Angeles, where he received a bachelor of science in business administration in 1949.

== Career ==
Briskin started his career as Norton Simon's assistant.

Briskin co-founded Gelson's Markets, a supermarket chain in Southern California, in 1951. He served as the chief executive officer and president of the Arden Group (a holding company for Gelson's Markets which includes two subsidiaries, Arden-Mayfair and Mayfair Reality) from 1978 to 2014, and as its chairman from 1994 to 2014.

Briskin serves as the chairman, president and chief executive officer of AMG Holdings, an investment holding company founded in 2011 and based in the Cayman Islands.

== Philanthropy ==
Through the Judy and Bernard Briskin Family Foundation, Briskin has made charitable contributions to the Cedars-Sinai Medical Center. He has also supported the Temple Israel of Hollywood, the Jewish Federation of Greater Los Angeles, the Los Angeles Jewish Home for the Aging, and the Venice Family Clinic. In 2015, he endowed the Judy and Bernard Briskin Center for Multiple Myeloma Research at the City of Hope National Medical Center in Duarte, California.

== Personal life ==
Briskin was married to Judy for 48 years, and they had eight children. He died at home on February 29, 2020.
