= Frank Rooney =

Frank Rooney may refer to:

- Frank Rooney (businessman), American businessman
- Frank Rooney (baseball) (1884–1977), Austro-Hungarian Major League Baseball infielder
- Frank Rooney (novelist)
