= Samuel Stillman Greene =

American educator (1810–1883)

Samuel Stillman Greene (May 3, 1810 – January 24, 1883) was an American educator who was a professor at Brown University, headmaster and trustee of the Worcester Academy, and superintendent of schools in Providence, Rhode Island and Springfield, Massachusetts.

== Early life ==
Greene was born in Belchertown, Massachusetts on May 3, 1810. He was the eight of eleven children born to Ebenezer Greene, a farmer who also taught at the local school during the winter. In 1828, Greene attended private school run by his brother, Rev. John Greene. The following year Greene began teaching in Belchertown. During the winter of 1830-31 he attended Leicester Academy. He enrolled in Brown University in 1833 and graduated in 1837.

== Teaching ==
After graduating from Brown, Greene became an assistant teacher at the Worcester County Manual Labor High School (later known as the Worcester Academy). He then served as its principal from 1838 to 1840, when he resigned due to ill health. He continued his association with the school as a trustee from 1852 until his death. During his time on the board of trustees, Greene successfully thwarted an effort to turn the school over to the Newton Theological Institution and in 1869 relocated the academy to its current location.

In 1839, Greene married Edna Amelia Bartlett of Worcester. They had one son, Frank Bartlett Greene. In 1854 he married Mary Adaline Bailey of Salem, Massachusetts. They had two sons (John Stimson Greene and Samuel Stuart Greene) and one daughter (Alice Greene Comstock).

In 1840, Greene became the first ever superintendent of schools in Springfield, Massachusetts. From 1842 to 1849 he taught in the Boston Public Schools. In 1846 he published his first of eight books on grammar. From 1849 to 1851 he was an agent of the Massachusetts Board of Education.

In 1851 he was made superintendent of schools in Providence, Rhode Island. He concurrently served as a professor of didactics at Brown. In 1852, Greene and Dana P. Colburn, an instructor from the Bridgewater Normal School, began a course of lectures for those who wished to become teachers. Their efforts would result in the creation of the Rhode Island Normal School in 1854. In 1855, Greene resigned as superintendent to become chairman of Brown's mathematics and civil engineering department. In 1864 he became a professor of natural philosophy and astronomy. In 1875 he switched to mathematics and astronomy. In 1880, Greene supervised the construction of Brown's baseball field, Lincoln Field (his two youngest sons were members of the team).

Greene also served on the Providence school committee for eighteen years. He died suddenly on January 24, 1883.

Educational offices
Preceded by Nathan Bishop	Superintendent of the Providence Public School District; 1851–1855	Succeeded by Rev. Dr. Daniel Leach
Preceded by Silas Bailey	Headmaster of the Worcester Academy; 1838–1840	Succeeded by Nelson Wheeler
