= Worcester Academy =

School in Worcester, Massachusetts, US

Coordinates: 42.252675°N 71.790703°W

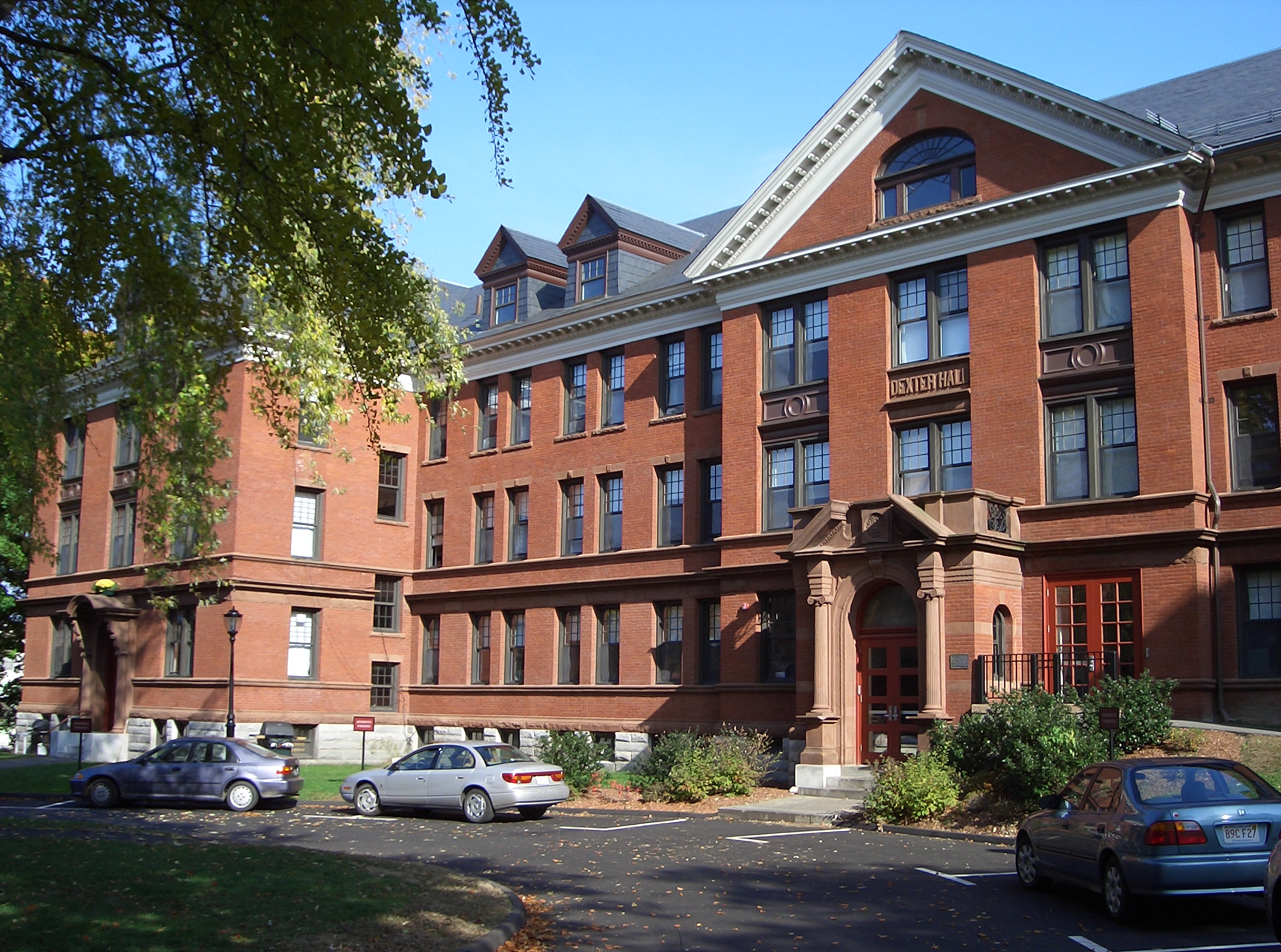
- Dexter Hall

Location
- 81 Providence Street; Worcester, Massachusetts 01604; United States

Information
- Type: Private; college-preparatory; day; boarding school
- Motto: Ἐφικνοῦ τῶν Καλῶν (Achieve the Honorable)
- Religious affiliation: Nonsectarian
- Established: 1834; 192 years ago
- Head of School: Kevin Breen
- Faculty: 80
- Grades: 6–12 & postgraduate
- Gender: Co-ed
- Enrollment: 450 upper school 65 middle school
- Average class size: 14
- Student to teacher ratio: 8:1
- Campus size: 71 acres (290,000 m^{2})
- Campus type: Urban
- Color: Maroon
- Athletics: 24 Interscholastic sports 54 Interscholastic teams
- Athletics conference: NEPSAC
- Mascot: Oskee
- Team name: Hilltoppers
- Newspaper: Vigornia
- Yearbook: The Towers
- Tuition: middle school day students: $43,225 upper school day students: $47,725 boarding students: $65,225 international students: $78,000
- Website: www.worcesteracademy.org

Worcester Academy is a co-ed private boarding school in Worcester, Massachusetts, serving grades 6-12. It is the oldest school founded in Worcester, Massachusetts, and one of the oldest day-boarding schools in the United States. A coeducational preparatory school, it belongs to the National Association of Independent Schools.

== History ==
Worcester Academy was founded in 1834 as the Worcester County Manual Labor High School; the name "Worcester Academy" was adopted in 1847.

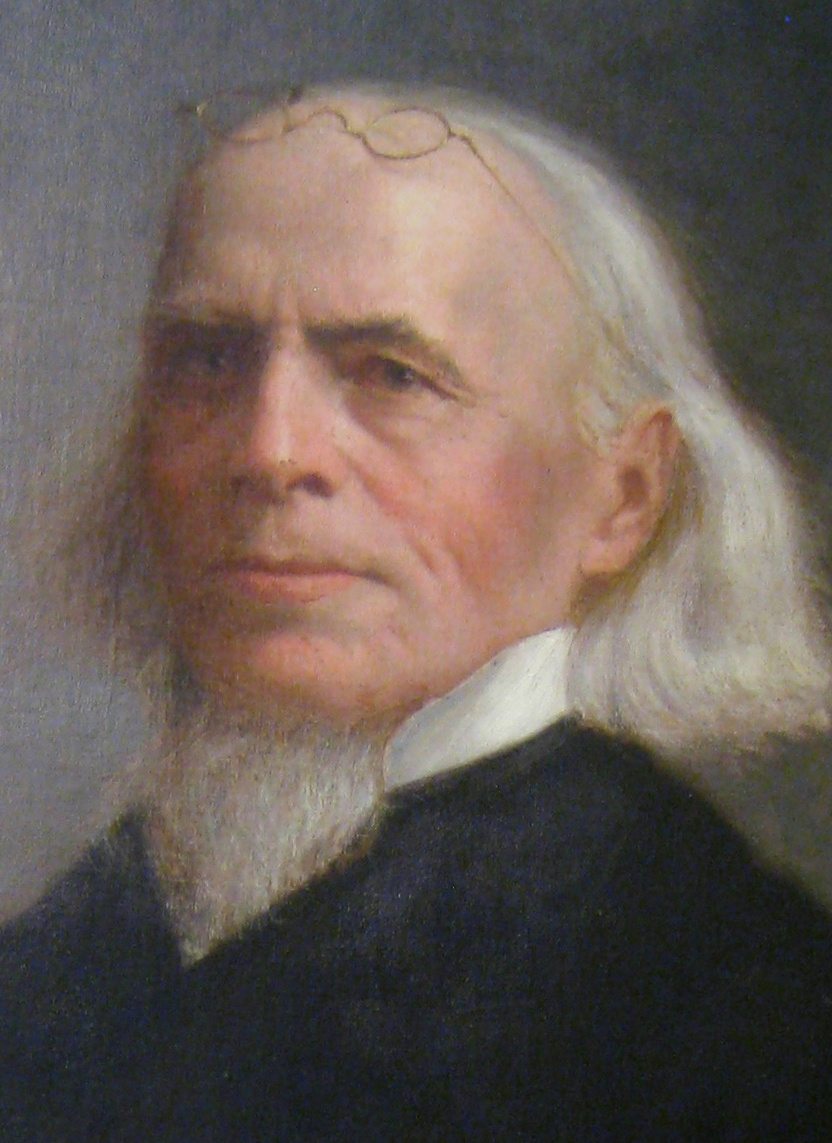
Isaac Davis, President of the Worcester Academy Trustees 1834 – 1873

Isaac Davis was a central figure in the school's early years, serving as President of the Worcester Academy Trustees from 1834 to 1873.

The school moved several times during its first decades. The first site was a 60 acre farm on what is now Main Street. In 1854 the school moved into the abandoned building of the American Antiquarian society at Belmont and Summer streets. Around this time, principals were paid little, and "were given a free hand to charge whatever tuition they could get, pay the expenses, and pocket the profit."

In 1869, Isaac Davis purchased the abandoned Dale General Hospital on Providence Street in the Union Hill neighborhood. Davis donated the building, a former Civil War military hospital, to the school as its new permanent home. The building was renamed Davis Hall in his honor.

Davis Hall served as Worcester Academy's only building for many years; at times, it served as a dormitory, reputedly haunted by ghosts of Civil War soldiers. Davis Hall was damaged by the hurricane of 1938, and demolished in 1965. It was replaced by Davol Hall.

Daniel Webster Abercrombie served as principal from 1882 to 1918. He established the school's motto "Achieve the Honorable" in 1890. He presided over an aggressive expansion of the school, including Kingsley Laboratories (1897) and The Megaron (1905).

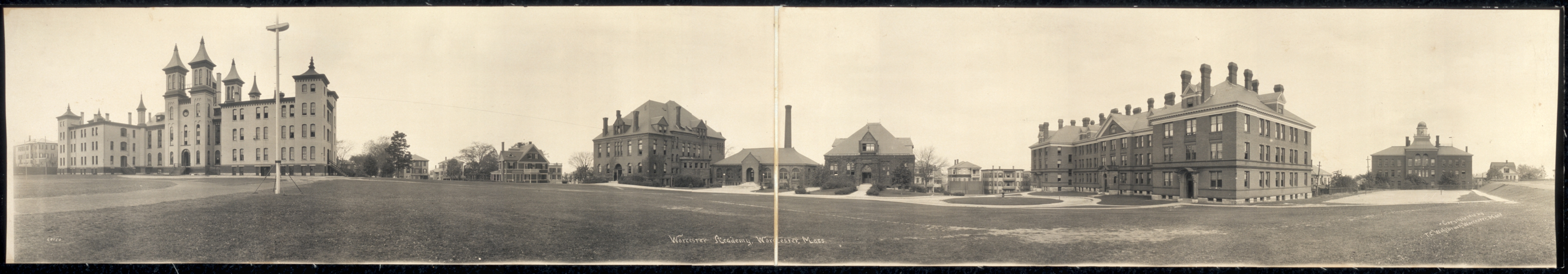
Worcester Academy in 1910. L to R: Davis Hall, Abercrombie House, Walker Hall, The Megaron, Adams Hall, Dexter Hall, and Kingsley Laboratories

== Demographics ==
As of 2018, 451 out of 600, or 68% of the school's students were white, 66 (11%) were Asian, 32 (5%) were Black, and 15 (2.5%) were Hispanic or Latino. The corresponding numbers for the community were 56% white, 8% Asian, 12% black and 21% Hispanic or Latino.

== Clubs ==
In the springs of 2010 and 2011, the We the People club won the Massachusetts championship and traveled to Washington, D.C. to participate in the national championship.

In 2011, Worcester Academy's math team won its seventh (and fourth straight) Worcester County Mathematics League championship, its seventh (and sixth straight) state championship, and its fourth New England championship (the third in six years).

== Notable alumni ==
Notable faculty and alumni include:

- John Barrett 1883, American diplomat
- William H. Bates 1936, U.S. Congressman
- H. Jon Benjamin 1984, actor, comedian
- Aliyah Boston 2019, first overall pick of the 2023 WNBA Draft
- George Boardman the Younger, 1846, missionary
- George B. Boomer 1847, Civil War General
- Bernard Briskin 1943, businessman, philanthropist
- Albert H. Bumstead 1894, Chief Cartographer, National Geographic Society, and inventor of sun compasses
- Kimberly Burwick 1993, poet
- Ralph A. "Doc" Carroll, 1909, Major League Baseball player, Philadelphia Athletics, 1916
- Anutin Charnvirakul, 1985, Prime Minister of Thailand
- Edwin W. Clark, 1841, Missionary to Nagaland, India
- Bill Cooke 1970, National Football League player
- Major General Norman Cota 1915, portrayed by actor Robert Mitchum in the 1962 movie classic The Longest Day
- Lou D'Allesandro 1956, educator, coach, and elected official
- Jim Davis 1962, chairman, New Balance Athletic Shoe
- William Stearns Davis 1896, historian and educator
- Dane DiLiegro 2007, actor and professional basketball player
- Clarence Dillon 1904, co-founder of investment bank Dillon, Read & Co., father of C. Douglas Dillon
- John F. Dryden 1857, Founder Prudential Insurance, U.S. Senator
- Arthur Duffey 1899, Olympic Sprinter, 1900 Paris
- Mark Fidrych 1974, former Detroit Tigers pitcher
- Bernie Friberg 1919, Major League Baseball player
- Jim Forbes 1978, multiple Emmy, ALMA, AP and Golden Mic award-winning writer, producer, correspondent and narrator of VH1's Behind the Music
- Major General Hugh J. Gaffey 1916, Patton's Chief of Staff
- Robert Gilchrist, 2010, professional basketball player
- Willis Goldbeck, 1910, movie producer and writer
- Robert Goldwyn, 1948, surgeon and health care advocate
- Kaz Grala, 2017, stock car racing driver
- Gilbert Hovey Grosvenor 1893, founder and first editor of National Geographic magazine
- Herman Gundlach 1931, Harvard Crimson football captain, Boston Braves lineman, NFL
- Bruno Haas 1915, Philadelphia Athletics pitcher and NFL player
- Alan Haberman 1947, supermarket executive credited with popularizing the barcode
- Ned Harkness 1939, college and professional hockey coach
- Brian Herosian, 1969, former NFL player with the Baltimore Colts and CFL player
- Louis Jean Heydt, 1921, stage and movie actor
- Arnold Hiatt, 1944, American businessman and election reformer
- Abbie Hoffman 1955, social and political activist in the 1960s
- Tom Holland 1962, film director
- John Hope 1890, educator and president of Atlanta University
- Ernest Martin Hopkins 1896, President of Dartmouth College
- Frank Reed Horton 1914, founder Alpha Phi Omega fraternity
- Tony Hulman 1920, Indianapolis Motor Speedway owner
- Lyman Jewett 1840, Baptist missionary who translated the Bible into Telugu
- Edward Jones 1873, co-founder of Dow Jones
- Arthur Kennedy 1932, stage and screen actor
- Stephen Knapp 1965, artist
- Stefan Lano 1970, symphonic conductor
- Dick Lasse 1954, NFL football player and college coach
- Armand LaMontagne 1958, sculptor of prominent athletes
- Andy Lee, 1998, actor, singer, and rapper of South Korean band Shinhwa
- Doug Leeds 1965, advertising/media executive and Broadway benefactor
- Lou Little 1912, college football coach
- Andrew Mamedoff, Battle of Britain pilot
- John W. Mayhew 1904, All-American football player and coach
- Roy McGillicuddy 1915, a.k.a. Roy Mack son of Connie Mack; co-owner of the Philadelphia Athletics
- Rep. Jim McGovern 1977, U.S. Congressman
- Charles E. Merrill 1904, co-founder of Merrill Lynch
- Alfred Henry Miller, 1923, NFL football player Boston Bulldogs, 1929
- Paul Mitchell, 1968, Major League Baseball pitcher
- Robert Munford, 1944, artist
- Jim O'Day, politician
- Neil Patel, 1987, publisher of The Daily Caller
- Jessica Phillips, 1989, actress
- Arthur Pope 1899, Persian art scholar and administrator
- Cole Porter 1909, Broadway composer
- Guy H. Preston, 1883, US Army brigadier general
- Sidney Hollis Radner, 1937 magician and expert on Houdini
- Joseph Raycroft 1892, college basketball and football coach; considered the "father of intramural athletics" at Princeton University
- Frank Rooney 1940, business executive
- Donald "Dee" Rowe 1947, basketball coach
- Thomas M. Salmon 1982, Vermont State Auditor
- John Edward Sawyer 1937, President of Williams College
- Canaan Severin 2012, NFL player
- Matt Shaw 2020, MLB player
- Dennis Shulman 1968, clinical psychologist, psychoanalyst, author, rabbi, and Democratic Party nominee for the United States Congress in New Jersey's Fifth Congressional District
- Mark Slade 1957, TV actor
- Jonathan Starr 1994, financial executive and philanthropist
- Charles Starrett 1922, the "Durango Kid"
- Robert Waring Stoddard 1924, businessman and benefactor
- Ira Stoll 1990, author and former managing editor of The New York Sun
- Jacob Stroyer 1872, ex-slave, minister, and author
- Prince Nandiyavat Svasti 1927, member of the Thai Royal Family and grandson to King Rama IV (1851–1868), a.k.a. Mongkut, the king of Siam depicted in the musical, The King and I
- Royal C. Taft 1872, Governor of Rhode Island
- Stanley F. Teele 1924, fourth dean of Harvard Business School
- Eli Thayer 1840, founder of the Oread Institute and the New England Emigrant Aid Company
- Webster Thayer 1876, Massachusetts judge, presided over the trial of Sacco and Vanzetti in 1920.
- Michael Tien 1968, Deputy, National People's Congress, Hong Kong and International clothing retailer
- Willard Tibbetts 1922, bronze medalist in the 3000 meter race in the 1924 Paris Olympics
- William Toomey 1957, gold-medal winning decathlete in the 1968 Summer Olympics
- Cyril G. Wates 1902, mountaineer, amateur astronomer, and author
- Lawrence Whitney 1911, Olympic athlete
- Walt Whittaker 1913, Major League Baseball pitcher
- Lewis Wilson 1939, actor

In certain instances, student-athletes attend Worcester Academy solely for their senior year, or for a single postgraduate year, to increase their exposure to college coaches or to improve their academic standing. Notable student-athletes include:

- David Ball 2003, New York Jets
- Colt Brennan 2003, quarterback for the University of Hawaii, voted third in 2007 Heisman Trophy Voting
- Dick Capp 1961, wide receiver for Green Bay Packers who appeared in Super Bowl II
- Rick Carlisle 1979, former NBA player, former coach of the 2011 NBA champion Dallas Mavericks, current coach of the Indiana Pacers
- Mo Cassara 1993, basketball coach and television analyst
- Jeff Cross, 1980, former NBA player
- Steven Daniels, 2012, former NFL player
- Pat Downey 1993, former NFL player
- Obinna Ekezie 1995, former NBA player
- Chet Gladchuk, Jr. 1969, Director of Athletics United States Naval Academy
- Jarrett Jack 2002, Brooklyn Nets of the NBA
- Aaron Jackson 2005, Houston Rockets of the NBA
- Mark Johnson 1986, former Major League Baseball player for the Los Angeles Angels, New York Mets, and Pittsburgh Pirates
- Jordan Lucas 2012, Chicago Bears of the NFL, Super Bowl LIV Champion
- Michael Malone 1989, Head coach Denver Nuggets
- Donn Nelson 1982, former NBA and international basketball coach, current Dallas Mavericks president of basketball operations; son of former Boston Celtics star Don Nelson
- Joe Philbin 1980, former head coach of the Miami Dolphins
- Sean Ryan 1998, former NFL player
- Craig Smith, former NBA player
- Tim Welsh 1980, former Providence College coach and sportscaster
- Mike Wilhelm 1986, Assistant Coach, Chicago Bulls

== Headmasters of Worcester Academy ==
Number	Name	Years
1st	Silas Bailey, D.D.	1834–1838
2nd	Samuel Stillman Greene, LL.D.	1838–1840
3rd	Nelson Wheeler, A.M.	1840–1847
4th	Eli Thayer 1840, A.M.	1847–1849
5th	Charles C. Burnett, A.M.	1849–1852
6th	Eleazer J. Avery, A.M.	1852–1854
7th	William S. Greene, A.M.	1854–1858
8th	Werden Reynolds, A.M.	1858–1860
9th	James R. Stone, D.D.	1860–1862
10th	Ambrose P. S. Stuart, A.M.	1862–1864
11th	Charles Ayer, A.B.	1865–1866
12th	Albert Prescott Marble, PhD	1866–1868
13th	William Carey Poland, A.B.	1868–1870
14th	Willard T. Leonard, M.A.	1870
15th	Rev. David Weston, A.B.	1870–1871
16th	John Day Smith, A.B.	1872–1875
17th	Nathan Leavenworth, A.M.	1875–1882
18th	Daniel Abercrombie, Litt.D., LL.D.	1882–1918
19th	Samuel Foss Holmes, A.M.	1918–1933
20th	Harold H. Wade	1933–1942
21st	LeRoy A. Campbell, PhD	1942–1950
22nd	Paul K. Phillips, A.B.	1950–1954
23rd	William S. Piper, Jr., Ed.D.	1954–1968
24th	Harold G. Rader, Ed.D.	1968–1969
25th	David R. Jefferson, B.A., B.D.	1969–1970
26th	Robert A. LaBranche 1946, M.S.	1970–1974
27th	John A. Bloom, M.A.	1974–1985
28th	Ben Williams, M.A.	1985–1991
29th	John Mackenzie, M.A.	1991–1997
30th	Dexter P. Morse, M Ed., C.A.G.S.	1997–2012
31st	Ronald M. Cino	2012–2021
32nd	Kevin Breen	2021–Present

== See also ==
- National Register of Historic Places listings in eastern Worcester, Massachusetts
