= Robert Goldwyn =

American surgeon, author and activist

Robert Malcolm Goldwyn
- Robert Malcolm Goldwyn
- Born: 1930; Worcester, Massachusetts, United States
- Died: March 23, 2010 (aged 79); Brookline, Massachusetts, United States
- Education: Harvard Medical School (MD)
- Occupations: Academic, editor-in-chief and plastic surgeon
- Spouses: Tatyana Robson Goldwyn, Roberta Goldwyn (deceased)

Robert Malcolm Goldwyn (Worcester, Massachusetts, 1930–2010) was an American surgeon; an author, activist, Professor of Surgery at Harvard Medical School, and Chief of Plastic Surgery at the Beth Israel Hospital from 1972 to 1996. He was the editor-in-chief of Plastic and Reconstructive Surgery for 25 years.

== Education ==
Goldwyn was senior class president and graduated from Worcester Academy in 1948 with second honors. He matriculated to Harvard College, then graduated as an MD from Harvard Medical School. During his internship and residency (1956–1961) at the Peter Bent Brigham Hospital in Boston, Massachusetts, he was also the Harvey Cushing Fellow in Surgery. His training in plastic surgery was at the University of Pittsburgh Medical Center from 1961 to 1963.

== Activism and Preservation ==
In 1960, he worked with Dr. Albert Schweitzer in Lambaréné, Gabon for two months. In 1972, he established The National Archives of Plastic Surgery in the Francis A. Countway Library of Medicine.

He was a founding member of Physicians for Social Responsibility and wrote articles on world peace, opposition to chemical and biological warfare, and medical ethics.

== Awards and honors ==
When the New England Society of Plastic and Reconstructive Surgeons established the Robert M. Goldwyn Lifetime Achievement Award and made Goldwyn its first recipient, he stated, "I do not really deserve this. But as Jack Benny said, ‘I have arthritis and I don't deserve that either.’

Goldwyn was a Visiting Professor to more than 70 institutions, universities, and hospitals in the United States and abroad and was an honorary member of more than a dozen national and international societies of plastic surgery. He was President of the 1994 Meeting of the American Association of Plastic Surgeons in St. Louis, Missouri. He was honored by France, Germany, and Italy with their highest medals for his work in plastic and reconstructive surgery. In Berlin, at the 2007 International Confederation for Plastic, Reconstructive and Aesthetic Surgery, he presented the inaugural "Ulrich Hinderer Memorial Lecture". His other awards include the 2005 Honorary Kazanjian Lectureship, 1991 Clinician of the Year of the American Association of Plastic Surgeons, the 2004 American Association of Plastic Surgeons Honorary Award, and the Presidential Citation of the American Society of Plastic and Reconstructive Surgeons.

== Bibliography ==
As a writer, he authored or co-authored more than 350 articles, more than 10 books, more than 50 chapters, and edited books including:

- The Unfavorable Result in Plastic Surgery: Avoidance and Treatment ISBN 0316319708, 9780316319706
- Reconstructive Surgery of the Breast ISBN 0316319716, 9780316319713
- Long-Term Results in Plastic and Reconstructive Surgery ISSN 0098-7484
- Reduction Mammaplasty ISBN 0316319775, 9780316319775
- The Patient and the Plastic Surgeon ISBN 0316319783, 9780316319782
- The Operative Note : Collected Editorials ISBN 0865774315, 9780865774315
- The Physician Traveler (18 volumes)
- Beyond Appearance: Reflections of a Plastic Surgeon - an autobiography ISBN 0396086691, 9780396086697
- Retired not dead: thoughts plastic surgical and otherwise ISBN 1905904428, 9781905904426

== Retirement ==
Marking his retirement in 2004 as editor-in-chief of Plastic and Reconstructive Surgery, Goldwyn was presented the American Society of Plastic Surgeons Special Recognition Award during the Plastic Surgery 2004 opening ceremonies in Philadelphia. The Journal's circulation, which was 5,100 when Goldwyn took over in 1980, by 2004 had achieved the number one peer-reviewed impact factor among all plastic surgery journals worldwide.

His final book, Retired not dead: thoughts plastic surgical and otherwise, was published in 2008.

== Death ==
At the age of 79, he died in his home in Brookline, Massachusetts, on March 23, 2010, after a 16-year battle with prostate cancer.
