= Herman Gundlach =

American football player (1913–2005)

No. 29
- Position: Guard

Personal information
- Born: July 16, 1913; Houghton, Michigan
- Died: May 5, 2005 (aged 91); Rochester, Minnesota

Career information
- High school: Houghton (Houghton, Michigan)
- College: Harvard (1931–1934)

Career history
- Boston Redskins (1935)

Career statistics
- Games played: 2
- Games started: 0
- Touchdowns: 0
- Stats at Pro Football Reference

Herman Gundlach, Jr. (July 16, 1913 – May 5, 2005) was an American football offensive lineman in the National Football League for the Boston Redskins. He played at Worcester Academy, then college football at Harvard University.

== Early life ==
Born and raised in Houghton, Michigan, Gundlach captained the football team at Houghton High School. After graduation, he attended Worcester Academy in Worcester, Massachusetts.

== College career ==
Gundlach played college football at Harvard, beginning on the freshman team before playing three years on varsity. He earned a spot in the starting lineup as a sophomore and was elected the team captain ahead of the 1934 season – the first guard to receive the honor since 1923. Gundlach played in the 1935 Chicago College All-Star Game.

== Professional career ==
In 1935, Gunlach signed with the Boston Redskins to play under his former college coach, Eddie Casey. He played in two games that season.

== Later life ==
From 1935 to 1941, Gundlach was employed by Sinclair Refining Company in Chicago and Atlanta, followed by the General Construction Company in Atlanta. He served as a major in the United States Army Corps of Engineers during World War II. After the war, Gunlach took over as president Herman Gundlach, Inc, a construction firm founded by his father, Hermann Gunlach, Sr., in 1898. Following in his footsteps, he held the position until his retirement in 1987. Gundlach was also named director of the Upper Peninsula Power Company in 1965. Additionally, he was president of Copper Country Copper Corp., president of Douglass Houghton Hotel Corp and chairman of the board of the Houghton National Bank. Gunlach was inducted into the Michigan Construction Hall of Fame as a member of the class of 2004.

Gunlach was also heavily involved in the community, winning many awards for his service. He was a member of the American Society of Civil Engineers, the American Concrete Institute, Chi Epsilon, the Houghton Rotary Club, the American League, Veterans of Foreign Wars and a trustee with Goodwill Farm. He served as the director and chairman of the Barbara Kettle Gundlach Shelter Home for Abused Women as well as the director of Oak House Inc. Gunlach also served as the president of the Michigan chapter of Associated General Contractors.

Gunlach married Barbara Kettle and they had four daughters. He died on May 5, 2005, in Rochester, Minnesota.
