= Jim Davis (businessman) =

American billionaire businessman

- Born: James S. Davis; May 17, 1943 (age 83); Brookline, Massachusetts, U.S.
- Education: Worcester Academy
- Alma mater: Middlebury College
- Occupation: Businessman
- Known for: Owner & chairman of New Balance; co-founder of Major League Lacrosse
- Children: 2

James S. Davis (born May 17, 1943) is an American billionaire businessman, the owner and chairman of New Balance, and an early investor in Major League Lacrosse.

== Early life ==
Davis was born in 1943, in Brookline, Massachusetts, the son of Greek immigrants. He attended Worcester Academy, and he received a bachelor's degree in biology and chemistry from Middlebury College in 1966. While in college, he played college football.

== Career ==
Davis started his career as a sales engineer at the LFE Corporation in Waltham, Massachusetts, and as marketing manager for the Applied Geodata Systems Division of Techven Associates of Cambridge, Massachusetts. In 1972, he bought New Balance, then only a 6-employee firm in Boston, and turned it into a 4,000-employee global corporation with revenues averaging around $2.5 billion every year. He has been a board member of the Sporting Goods Manufacturers Association, the International Athletic Footwear & Apparel Manufacturers Association, and the Two/Ten Foundation. He also sits on the board of directors of the Citizen's Bank in Providence, Rhode Island.

He has donated $5 million to the University of Maine. He is the recipient of an Honorary Doctorate from his alma mater, Middlebury College. A library on its campus has also been named for him. He formerly sat on its board of trustees, on the Worcester Academy's, and on Newbury College's. He sits on the board of trustees of the Sports Museum of New England and formerly Boston Children's Museum.

As of 2017, Davis is the 324th richest person in the world, and the 94th richest in the United States, with an estimated wealth of US$5.1 billion.

== Personal life ==
Davis is married, and has two children. He lives in Newton, Massachusetts.

== Politics ==
Davis has donated $500,000 to Mitt Romney's Super PAC, Restore Our Future.

Davis is a major Republican donor, and has been a major donor to the campaigns of Donald Trump. He donated almost $400,000 to the Trump Victory Committee in September 2016. In an interview given to Wall Street Journal reporter Sara Germano on the day following the 2016 presidential election of Donald Trump, a New Balance senior executive suggested support for Trump due to his opposition to the Trans-Pacific Partnership. Widely reported social-media reaction documented numerous New Balance owners destroying or disposing of their shoes—with many pledging lifetime boycotts of the company.

Davis gave $495,000 to a super PAC supporting 2021 Boston mayoral election candidate Annissa Essaibi George, who won second place in the preliminary election in September, enough to advance to the general election. Davis supported a campaign against the "Fair Share" amendment in Massachusetts, which increased taxes on annual incomes above $1 million by 4% and passed in 2022.

For the 2023 Boston City Council election, he prominently backed a slate of candidates. His slate all ran as challengers to other candidates backed by Mayor Michelle Wu. This was unsuccessful, as all of the candidates that Wu had endorsed won election. On April 1, 2025, he gave $1 million to the Super PAC Your City, Your Future, which supported Josh Kraft's campaign against Wu in the 2025 Boston mayoral election.

== See also ==
- List of Greek Americans
- List of Donald Trump presidential campaign endorsements, 2016
