= Worcester County Mathematics League =

The Worcester County Mathematics League (WOCOMAL) is a high school mathematics league composed of 32 high schools, most of which are in Worcester County, Massachusetts. It organizes seven mathematics competitions per year, four at the "varsity" level (up to grade 12) and three at the "freshman" level (up to grade nine, including middle school students). In the 2013–14 school year, WOCOMAL began allowing older students to compete in the freshman level competitions, calling this level of participation "junior varsity."

Top schools from the varsity competition are selected to attend the Massachusetts Association of Math Leagues state competition.

== Contest format ==
A competition consists of four, or nine rounds at the Freshman level or five rounds at the Varsity level. The team round consists of eight problems at the Freshman level and nine at the Varsity level. Regardless of level, each student competes in three of the individual rounds.

In each individual round, competing students have ten minutes to answer three questions, worth one, two, and three points. The maximum meet score for a student is eighteen points.

== History ==
The Worcester County Mathematics League was originally formed in 1963 as the Southern Worcester County Mathematics League (Sowocomal). The winningest school in league history is St. John's High School, with twelve league championships in the fourteen-year span between 1983–84 and 1996–97. Algonquin Regional High School won six consecutive league championships from 1998–99 to 2003–04.

== Current events ==
The league currently has members from Western Middlesex Counties. In the past, it has had members from Hampshire County, Massachusetts, and Windham County, Connecticut.

In the 2015–16 season, the champion of both the varsity division and the freshman division was the Advanced Math and Science Academy Charter School.

League members AMSA Charter, Worcester Academy, and Mass Academy and took first, second, and third place among small-sized schools at the 2016 Massachusetts state championship math meet. St. John's High School took fifth place among medium-sized schools. WOCOMAL schools have taken first place in the state among small schools for thirteen consecutive years.

At the 2016 New England championship math meet, league members AMSA Charter, Worcester Academy, and Mass Academy took first, second, and fifth place respectively among small schools. WOCOMAL schools have taken first or second place in New England among small schools for twelve consecutive years.
