= William Stearns Davis =

American novelist (1877-1930)

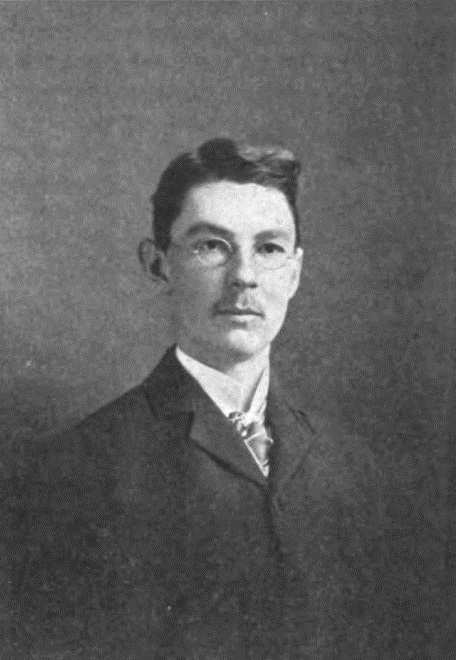
Portrait of William Stearns Davis.

William Stearns Davis (April 30, 1877 – February 15, 1930) was an American educator, historian, and author. He has been cited as one who "contributed to history as a scholarly discipline, . . . [but] was intrigued by the human side of history, which, at the time, was neglected by the discipline." After first experimenting with short stories, he turned while still a college undergraduate to longer forms to relate, from an involved (fictional) character's view, a number of critical turns of history. This faculty for humanizing, even dramatizing, history characterized Davis' later academic and professional writings as well, making them particularly suitable for secondary and higher education during the first half of the twentieth century in a field which, according to one editor, had "lost the freshness and robustness . . . the congeniality" that should mark the study of history. Both Davis' fiction and non-fiction are found in public and academic libraries today.

== Life ==
Davis was born April 30, 1877, in the presidential mansion of Amherst College, Amherst, Massachusetts, where his mother's father had been president for the twenty-two years preceding his birth. His father was Congregational minister William Vail Wilson Davis; his mother Francis Stearns. Due both to childhood illnesses and to family moves occasioned by his father's call to new congregations, Davis was largely educated at home until he entered Worcester Academy in 1895. In 1897 he matriculated at Harvard. Fascinated by maps and by historical figures, he had begun writing stories for himself while still at home. He now turned this experience and his desire to humanize history to writing historical novels, the first of which, A Friend of Caesar, was published in the year he graduated as a member of Phi Beta Kappa. He continued at Harvard, being the first first-year graduate student to receive the Harvard Thayer Graduate Scholarship, and earning his A.M. in 1901 and his PhD in 1905. During these same years he continued publishing historical fiction.

In 1904, Davis began his formal teaching career, beginning as a lecturer at Radcliffe College while finishing his doctorate. He continued thereafter at Beloit College (instructor, 1906–07), Oberlin College (assistant professor of medieval and modern european history, 1907–1909), and finally at the University of Minnesota (professor of history, 1909–1927). "He was an excellent teacher with the ability to put life into his lectures." His steady output of non-fiction in both history and the historical background to contemporary world affairs began with his time at Minnesota. Professionally, he was a member of the American Historical Association.

In 1911, he married Alice Williams Redfield of Minneapolis. He retired from teaching in 1927, moving back to New England and taking up residence in Exeter, New Hampshire, with the intention of devoting all of his time to writing. However, he died of pneumonia following an operation at the age of 52 on February 15, 1930.

== Writings ==
=== Fiction ===
Davis' books are characterized by his desire to tell a story. For his historical fiction, he chose subjects with dramatic flavor, such as the battles of Thermopylae and Salamis, the coming to power of Julius Caesar, Leo the Isaurian's defense of Constantinople, the beginning of the Protestant Reformation, and the start of the American Revolution. Stylistically, they use narrative of the kind which Josephine Tey called "history-with-conversation", and his earliest novels have some of the attributes of scholarly publication, including meticulous (and copious) footnotes or appendices. Indeed, a reviewer of a later fictional work noted that previously "Mr. Davis has erred in overabundance of detail. Knowing much is sometimes more troublesome than knowing little, and Mr. Davis's knowledge has in times past seemed too large for his story. In Falaise, however, this fault is to a most felicitous degree overcome . . . ." The American National Biography noted that his fictional works "were not classics, . . . but they were accurate and maintained an interesting story line." He himself would become deeply involved in such writings, to the point of depression when one was finished.

=== Non-fiction ===
In a similar manner, the elements of narrative and drama are part of his non-fiction, much of which was written for teaching purposes. His 1910 work on wealth and money in first-century Rome begins with an almost journalistic daily-weekly narrative of bank failures and trading house suspensions leading to a financial panic in 33 AD (which must have read all too familiarly to those who had just weathered the 1907 crash). The opening of The Roots of the War, perhaps his most contemporaneously widely read nonfiction book, portrays Bismarck, Moltke, and Roon at dinner in 1870, planning what would become the Franco-Prussian War. Among his last works, Europe Since Waterloo (and all the revisions based upon it) begins with a narrative picture of Napoleon on the deck of the British man-o'-war transporting him to his final exile in St. Helena. Forty years later, Kurt Schmeller, producing the latest revision of that work, would say that he "sought to retain the powerful and dramatic narrative of earlier editions", and Theodore H. Von Laue's foreword to the same edition would cite Davis' "forceful, lively, and down-to-earth style" as a motive to retain the core of a work then moving towards a half-century of use.

Davis' strong anti-German sentiment colored much of his later non-fiction writing, particularly in his articles and letters to various periodicals. He was a forceful advocate of military preparedness in the years leading up to World War I, for which he was duly criticized in the widely pacifistic feeling of the times (see for example the 1916 exchange of letters in The Survey). During World War I, Davis and many other academic historians desired to support the war but hesitated between a professionally ethical approach to history and a firm belief in President Wilson's expressed ideals in advocating American intervention in the War. Davis chose to participate in the work of the government-sponsored Committee on Public Information (CPI). Davis in particular provided historical background and context to the Committee's pamphlet on Wilson's war message to Congress. For this work, in the years following the War, he and the other participants were criticized by some contemporaries belonging to the "revisionist" historical school, such as Harry Elmer Barnes. Succeeding next-generation scholars in the same tradition were equally critical. A particularly outspoken critic, C. Hartley Gratton, said of Davis' CPI efforts and of his 1918 The Roots of the War that there was "free use of gossip, and the 'revelations' of the Creel Bureau are accepted as definitive truth". Davis himself would write in 1926 of the earlier work that "very little of [that] hastily prepared material has endured under the cold scrutiny demanded by added information and years of retrospect.". In view of Davis' retirement and early death, what long-term effect such criticisms might have had upon him is unknowable. Blakey sums up the revisionists' efforts by saying that, however they changed the practice of historical writing, "their impact on the subsequent lives and careers of the embattled historians was slight to the point of being negligible," and this could apply fairly to Davis.

=== Historical approach ===
Throughout his writing career, both of fiction and non-fiction, Davis' "angle" to history, as he himself put it in his preface to Europe Since Waterloo, included:

"a belief in a just form of nationalism, and that a devoted loyalty to native land is entirely reconcilable with an ardent love for wide humanity.

"an intense belief in democracy, . . . and that the modern age is bound to resume the old, old battle against the vicious assumption that some select group of men . . . is competent to decree the destinies of an entire people.

"Finally, . . . a matured belief that only as the spirit of Christianity penetrates the hearts of men will human brotherhood and wide-spread, enduring happiness be achieved . . . . If the so-called Christian nations and rulers have all too often failed unworthily, their failure has been because they knew not the essence of Christianity, however eagerly they have usurped the name."

Stylistically, Davis never gave up on writing stories as a medium to convey his love for history as he saw it, and his intense conviction that the knowledge of history should matter to his contemporaries. He had a faculty for describing critical scenes, such as the expulsion of the tribunes in A Friend of Caesar or Luther before the Diet of Worms in The Friar of Wittenberg. In his day, he was known for his "vivid, almost melodramatic prose style". Twentieth Century Authors would credit him with having welded "fact and fiction without loss of narrative intensity or historical plausibility."

== Books published ==
=== Non-fiction ===
- Outline History of the Roman Empire (44 B.C. to 378 A.D.) (1909)
- The Influence of Wealth in Imperial Rome (1910)
- Readings in Ancient History. Two volumes. Vol. I: Greece and the East (1912). Vol. II: Rome and the West (1913)
- A Day in Old Athens: A Picture of Athenian Life (1914). This work was recently adapted by Charles Douglas Smith and republished as Now That You Asked: Ancient Athens (2007)
- A History of Mediaeval and Modern Europe for Secondary Schools (with Norman Shaw McKendrick) (1914)
- The Roots of the War: A Non-technical History of Europe, 1870–1914, A.D. (with William Anderson and Mason W. Tyler) (1918), published in the United Kingdom as Armed Peace (1919)
- A History of France from the Earliest Times to the Treaty of Versailles (1919)
- A Short History of the Near East, from the Founding of Constantinople (330, A.D. to 1922) (1922)
- Life on a Mediaeval Barony: A Picture of a Typical Feudal Community in the Thirteenth Century (1923)
- A Day in Old Rome: A Picture of Roman Life (1925)
- Europe Since Waterloo (1926). This work was revised and extended four times by Walter Phelps Hall under the title The Course of Europe Since Waterloo (1941, 1947, 1951, 1957). A still later revision by Kurt R. Schmeller was published as Hall & Davis' The Course of Europe Since Waterloo (1968).
- The French Revolution as Told in Fiction (1927)
- Life in Elizabethan Days: A Picture of a Typical English Community at the End of the Sixteenth Century (posthumous, 1930)

=== Fiction ===
- A Friend of Caesar: A Tale of the Fall of the Roman Republic (1900).
- "God Wills It!": A Tale of the First Crusade (1901)
- Belshazzar: A Tale of the Fall of Babylon (1902)
- The Saint of the Dragon's Dale: A Fantastic Tale (1903)
- A Victor of Salamis: A Tale of the Days of Xerxes, Leonidas, and Themistocles (1907)
- The Friar of Wittenberg (1912)
- The Beauty of the Purple: A Romance of Imperial Constantinople Twelve Centuries Ago (1924)
- Falaise of the Blessed Voice (1904), republished as The White Queen (1925)
- Gilman of Redford: A Story of Boston & Harvard College on the Eve of the Revolutionary War, 1770–1775 (1927)
- The Whirlwind: An Historical Romance . . . of the French Revolution (1929)
