= Boston Medical Library =

Medical library in Massachusetts US

Coordinates: 42°20′07″N 71°06′14″W

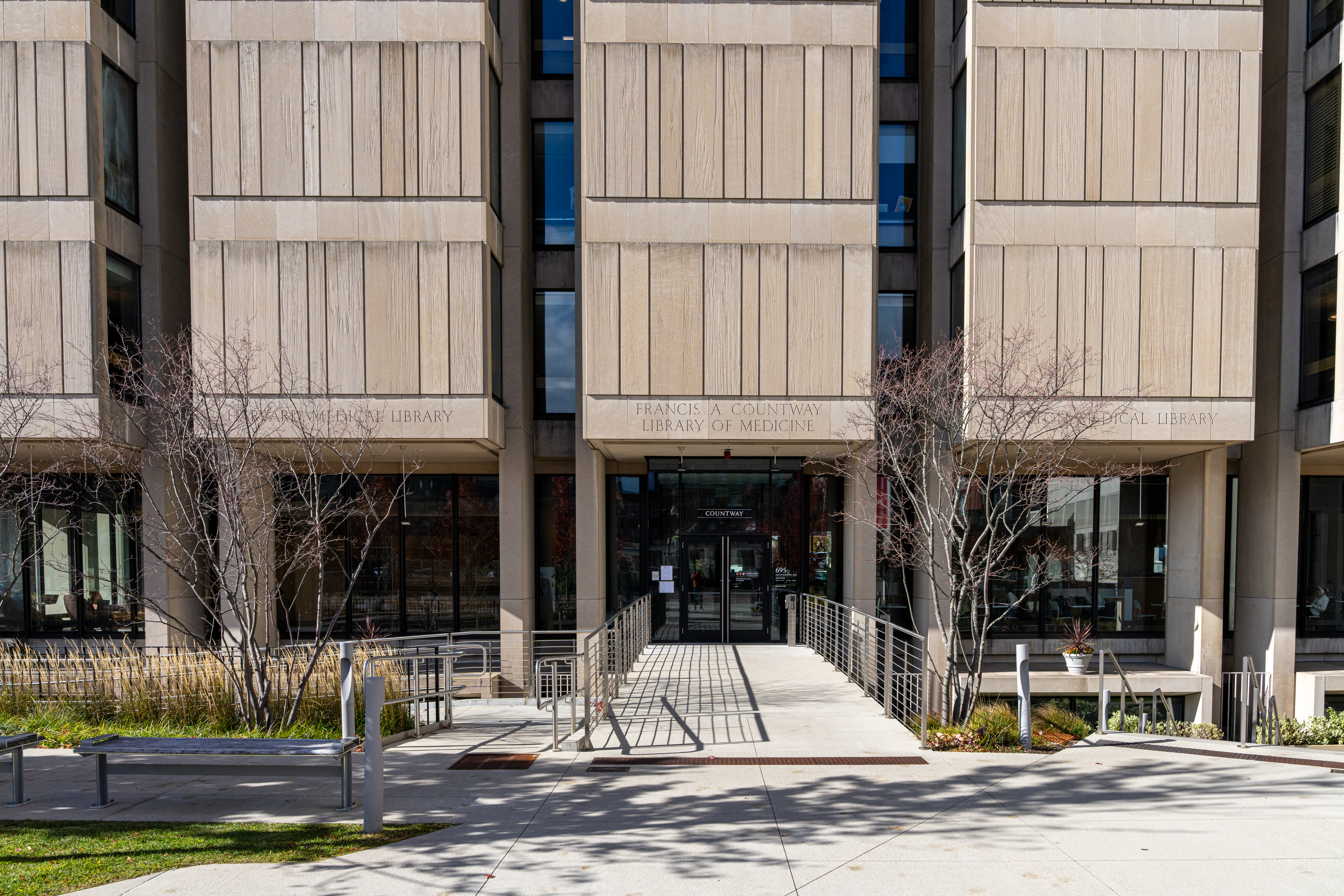
Boston Medical Library

The Boston Medical Library, founded in 1875 in Boston, Massachusetts, was originally organized to alleviate the problem of scattered distribution of medical texts throughout Boston. It has since evolved into the "largest academic medical library in the world".

== Early history ==
In 1875, the Society for Medical Observation, the Society for Medical Improvement, the Treadwell Library at the Massachusetts General Hospital, and the Public Library all had volumes of information that needed to be more accessible to physicians. This was the second attempt to create a medical library in the city; the first attempt was in 1805. This second library was incorporated with the first "as an independent institution under the control of the profession as a whole". James Read Chadwick, a gynecologist, collected books, pamphlets, and medical periodicals and make this material accessible to the practicing physician. It later became the later the Boston Medical Library (BML). Oliver Wendell Holmes Sr., Parkman Professor of Anatomy and Physiology at Harvard, served as the BML's first president and writer Librarian.

== The Francis A. Countway Library of Medicine ==
In 1960, the BML and the Harvard Medical Library combined their collections. It was housed in a new building named for Lever Brothers executive Francis A. Countway, whose sister, after his death, gave $3.5 million of his fortune toward the library.

== Current developments ==
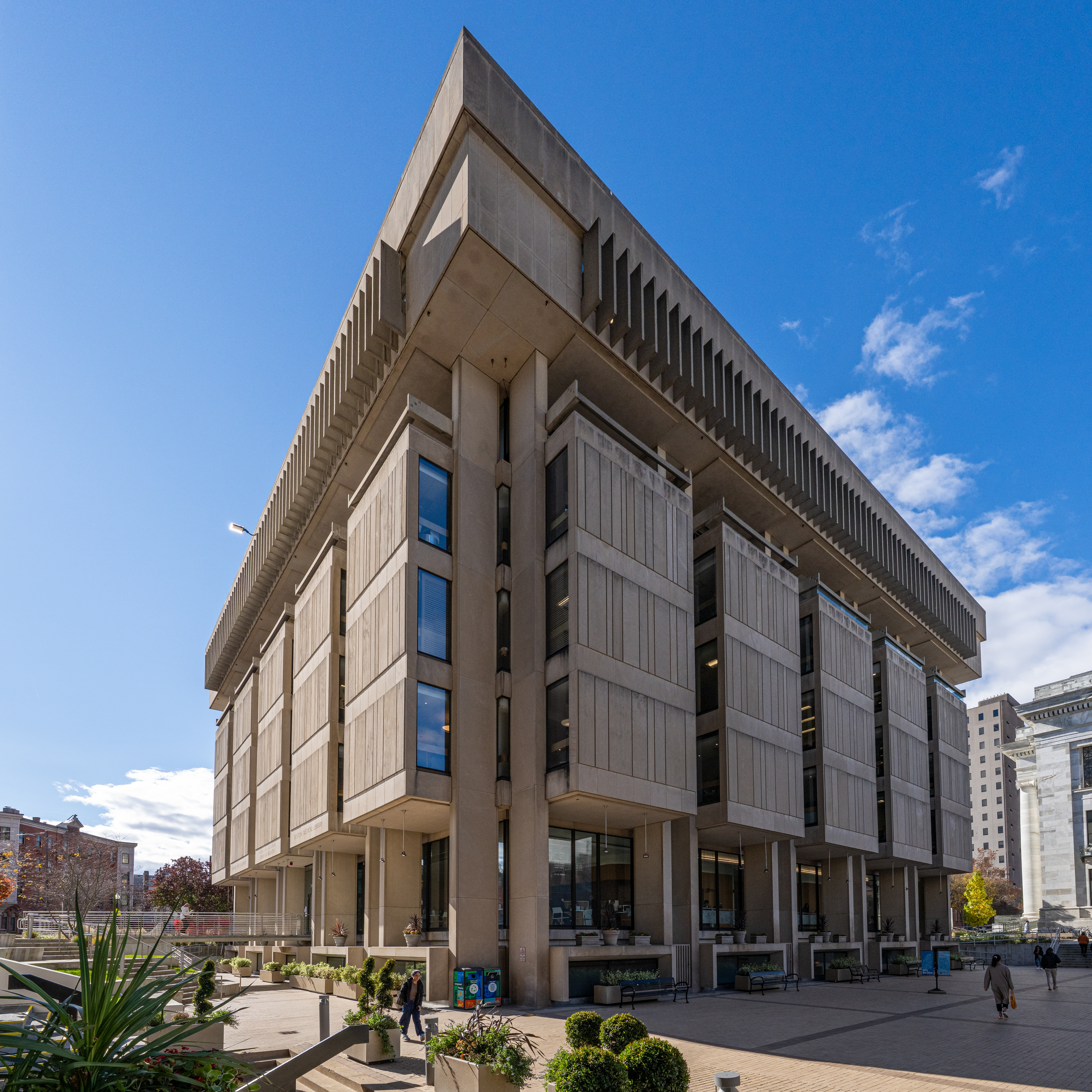
Full Library

In 1999, the Rare Books and Special Collections Department of the Countway Library assumed custodial responsibility for the Warren Anatomical Museum. Among its holdings is the skull of Phineas Gage, whose life after a traumatic brain injury contributed significantly to medical science.

The department was renamed the Center for the History of Medicine in 2004. It hosts rotating exhibits about the history of medicine from the library collections. The displays are located in the lobby area and are open to the public. As of 2019, however, exhibits are closed while the Library undergoes a renovation; the building is slated to reopen in 2021.

According to the History of Medicine Division of the National Institutes of Health's National Library of Medicine, The Francis A. Countway Library of Medicine is the "largest academic medical library in the world, and its collections, which have been formed over nearly two centuries, sometimes through the medical holdings of other libraries, include rare and historical materials that can be numbered among the largest in the world." The New England Journal of Medicine noted that The Francis A. Countway Library of Medicine loaned out material from the 19th century in order to make the 2010 electronic-conversion possible, as paper copies of some issues of the Journal were found missing from their own archive.

As of March 3, 2022, the BML ended the partnership with the Harvard Medical Library. BML collections were removed from the Countway Library. The BML announced a future partnership with University of Massachusetts Chan Medical School.

== Collections ==
Boston Medical Library includes the following collections:

- National Archives of Plastic Surgery, established in 1972 by Robert Goldwyn
- History of medicine (802 incunabula)
- European books printed 16th–20th centuries
- English books published 1475–20th century, American books 18th–20th centuries, Bostoniana
- Medical Hebraica and Judaica, 14th–20th centuries
- Manuscripts and archives, especially of New England origin (20 million items)
- Medical library of Oliver Wendell Holmes Sr. (900 titles)
- Warren Library of early works in surgery (2,000 volumes)
- Friedrich Tiedemann collection of anatomy and physiology (4,000 items)
- Historical collection in radiology
- Medical prints, photographs and artwork (35,000)
- Storer Collection of medical medals (6,000)

== See also ==
- Boston Medical Library (1805–1826)
