= Teege =

Teege is a surname. Notable people with the surname include:

- Jennifer Teege (born 1970), German writer
- Joachim Teege (1925–1969), German actor

== See also ==
- Teele
