= Kimberly Burwick =

American poet

Kimberly Burwick is an American poet. Her honors include the 2007 Anthony Hecht Poetry Prize (finalist) and the Dorothy Sargent Rosenberg Memorial Fund Poetry Prize and fellowships from the Vermont Studio Center and Provincetown Fine Arts Work Center.

She is author of five poetry collections, most recently, Brightword (Carnegie Mellon University Press), and including Horses in the Cathedral (Anhinga Press, 2010), and Has No Kinsmen (Red Hen Press, 2006). Her poems have been published in many literary journals and magazines including Fence, Kalliope, Barrow Street, Hayden’s Ferry Review, The Indiana Review, Hotel Amerika, and The Literary Review.

== Life ==
Burwick was born and raised in Worcester, Massachusetts and graduated from Worcester Academy. She holds a B.A. from the University of Wisconsin and an M.F.A. from Antioch University.

Burwick teaches at Washington State University and in the U.C.L.A. Extension Writer's Program. She currently lives in Moscow, Idaho.

Her work Horses in the Cathedral won the Robert Dana-Anhinga Prize for Poetry.

== Published works ==
- Brightword (Carnegie Mellon University Press, 2019)
- Custody of the Eyes (Carnegie Mellon University Press, 2017)
- Good Night Brother (Burnside Review, 2014)
- Horses in the Cathedral (Anhinga Press, 2011)
- Has No Kinsman (Red Hen Press, 2006)
