= Boston Medical Library (1805–1826) =

Library in Massachusetts, US

The Boston Medical Library (1805–1826) in Boston, Massachusetts, was an offshoot of the Boston Society for Medical Improvement. The library "was founded by a group of doctors, a number of officers were then appointed. John Collins Warren was the Treasurer, John G. Coffin the Secretary. James Jackson (physician) and John C. Howard were the Trustees. " In 1826 the library was transferred to the Boston Athenæum.

== See also ==
- Boston Medical Library
