= Frank Rooney (businessman) =

American businessman

Frank Rooney was a wealthy American businessman.

Rooney amassed his fortune by managing two highly successful companies. As a young man, he graduated from Worcester Academy and the University of Pennsylvania, and began a twenty-year career as the CEO of Melville Corporation. Under Rooney's management, the company's revenues grew from $180 million to $7 billion, primarily through acquisition, the CVS/pharmacy chain being the most notable. After this success, Rooney retired to his homes in New York State, Nantucket, and Florida. In 1990, he was pressed into service by Warren Buffett, whose company, Berkshire Hathaway, was about to buy the shoe manufacturer H.H. Brown, which was formerly managed by his father-in-law. Rooney felt at ease running the $400 million H.H. Brown, where he only works full-time during the spring and fall. He notes that his informal agreement with Buffett is that he only work one day a week for the next twenty years.
