= Silas Bailey =

American educator (1809–1874)

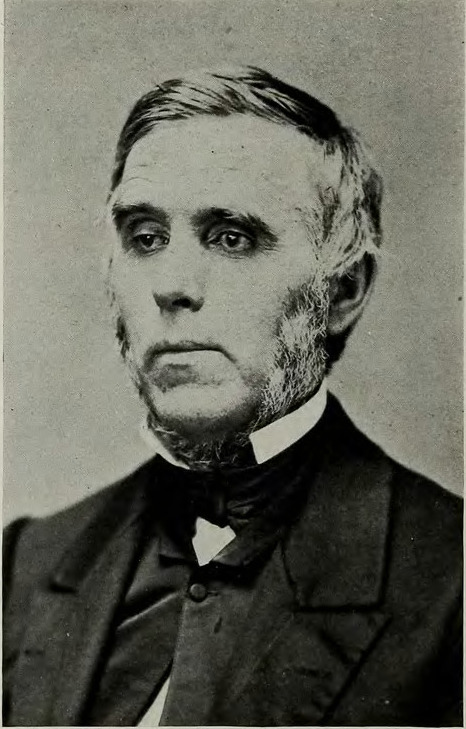
- Born: June 12, 1809; Sterling
- Died: June 30, 1874; Paris

Silas Bailey (June 12, 1809 – June 30, 1874) was an American Baptist minister and educator. He was the first headmaster of the Worcester Academy, the second president of Franklin College, and the third president of Denison University.

== Early life ==
Silas Bailey was born on June 12, 1809 in Sterling, Massachusetts. He prepared for college at the Leicester Academy. He chose to attend Brown University due to his admiration for its president, Francis Wayland.

== Career ==
Bailey graduated from Brown in 1834 and became the first headmaster of the Worcester County Manual Labor High School, later known as the Worcester Academy. He resigned in 1838 to enter the ministry. After studying at the Newton Theological Institution, he became a pastor at the Baptist church in East Thompson, Connecticut. From 1842 to 1845, he was an agent of the church's missionary unit in New York. He then served as a pastor in Westborough, Massachusetts.

On November 12, 1846, Bailey was elected president of Granville College (later known as Dennison University) in Granville, Ohio. He accepted the position in January 1847 and assumed the presidency that fall. Due to the institution's poor financial condition, Bailey recommended moving it to a more prosperous community. In 1852, the college's board of trustees voted to remain in Granville and Bailey resigned. He then became president of the Baptist college at Franklin, Indiana, where he remained for ten years. After filling a pastorate at Lafayette, Indiana for three years he accepted the professorship of theology at Kalamazoo College, Michigan. He retired in 1869 and returned to Lafayette.

== Personal life and death ==
Bailey married twice. His first wife, Mary A. Goddard of Grafton, Massachusetts, died in 1873. His second wife, Rosa H. Adams, was a Baptist missionary. He had no children.

Bailey traveled to Syria in 1873. He died on June 30, 1874 in Paris while on his return trip. He bequeathed his library to Franklin College.
