= New Balance 99X Series =

Series of athletic shoes

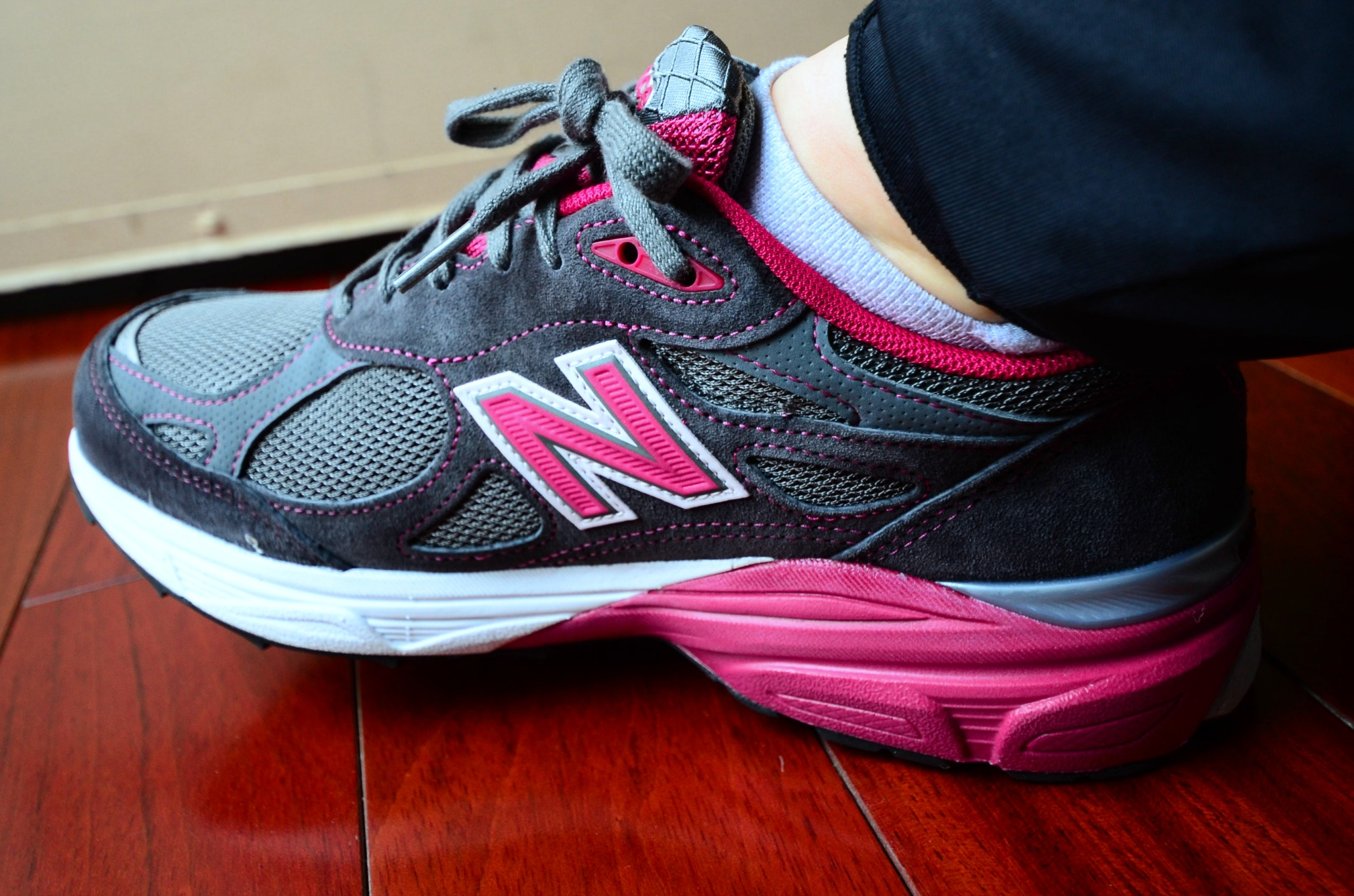
- New Balance Women's 990v3
- Type: Sneakers
- Inventor: New Balance
- Inception: 1982; 44 years ago
- Manufacturer: New Balance

New Balance 99X Series is a series of athletic shoes produced by New Balance since the introduction of the first New Balance 990 in 1982. The shoes have been updated sporadically since the original 990, all models have used the 99X numbering format, and some model numbers have been reused throughout the years.

== Recognition ==
On the 30th anniversary of the shoe in 2012, the New York Times reported, "The 990 has a cult following: according to New Balance officials, it was favored by Steve Jobs, and has also been worn by the actors Ben Affleck, Jennifer Garner and Hilary Duff. Forbes, BBC and other media also reported how Jobs wore the shoes frequently.

The 990 series have gained notoriety in pop culture. Lil Uzi Vert references the shoe in his song Canadian Goose: "990s that's the New Bs.". The 990 series are one of Action Bronson's favorite shoes, and he has produced a number of collaborative designs with New Balance.

New Balance Senior Designer Andrew Nyssen led the design of the 990 in 2012.

== Series history ==
Most of the information on the early models of the 99X Series is available on two New Balance promotional histories of the series in video format.

- New Balance 990 - 1982
- New Balance 995 - 1986
- New Balance 996 - 1988/1989
- New Balance 997 - 1990/1991
- New Balance 998 - 1993
- New Balance 999 - 1996
- New Balance 990v2 - 1998
- New Balance 991 - 2001
- New Balance 992 - 2006
- New Balance 993 - 2008
- New Balance 990v3 - 2012
- New Balance 990v4 - 2016
- New Balance 990v5 - 2019
- New Balance 990v6 - 2022
- New Balance 991v2 - 2023
- New Balance 990v7 - 2026
