= Current Diabetes Reports =

- Discipline: Endocrinology
- Language: English
- Edited by: Jose C. Florez

Publication details
- History: 2001–present
- Publisher: Springer Science+Business Media
- Frequency: Monthly
- Impact factor: 3.568 (2017)

Standard abbreviations
- ISO 4: Curr. Diabetes Rep.
- NLM: Curr Diab Rep

Indexing
- ISSN: 1534-4827 (print); 1539-0829 (web)
- LCCN: 2001214171
- OCLC no.: 871804542

Links
- Journal homepage; Online archive

Current Diabetes Reports is a monthly peer-reviewed medical journal that publishes review articles on all aspects of diabetes. It was established in 2001 and is published by Springer Science+Business Media. The editor-in-chief is Jose C. Florez (Massachusetts General Hospital). According to the Journal Citation Reports, the journal has a 2017 impact factor of 3.568.
