= Teel =

Teel may refer to:

== People ==
=== Family name ===
- Diane Teel (born 1948), American racing driver
- Kyle Teel (born 2002), American baseball player
- Mike Teel (born 1986), American football quarterback

=== Given name ===
- Teel Bivins (1947–2009), United States ambassador to Sweden 2004–2006
- Teel Bruner (born 1964), American football safety

=== Middle name ===
- William Teel Baird (1819–1897), Canadian military figure

== Other uses ==
- Teel (comics), a fictional character from DC Comics
- Teel–Crawford–Gaston Plantation in Americus, Georgia, U.S.
- Teel Middle School, a defunct school of the Empire Union School District in Modesto, California, U.S.
- Teel's Marsh, a playa in Nevada, U.S.

== See also ==
- Teal
- Teale
- Theel
