= Stanley F. Teele =

Stanley F. Teele (February 26, 1906 – May 29, 1967) was the fourth dean of the Harvard Business School.

Born on February 26, 1906, Teele grew up in Somerville, Massachusetts, and attended high school there. In September, 1923, he entered Worcester Academy and graduated from there in 1924. He then matriculated at Amherst College, from which he received an A.B. degree in 1928. In 1930, he received an M.B.A. from Harvard Business School, then in 1933 received a doctorate in commercial science. In 1935, he joined the faculty of the Harvard Business School as a professor of marketing and in 1955 he became fourth Dean there. He served as Dean until 1962, when he stepped down for health reasons. He returned to Amherst College where he was the Treasurer and died in May, 1967.

== Memory ==
Teele Hall of Harvard Business School was renamed in 2000 in his memory.
