= Venice Family Clinic =

Health center in Los Angeles

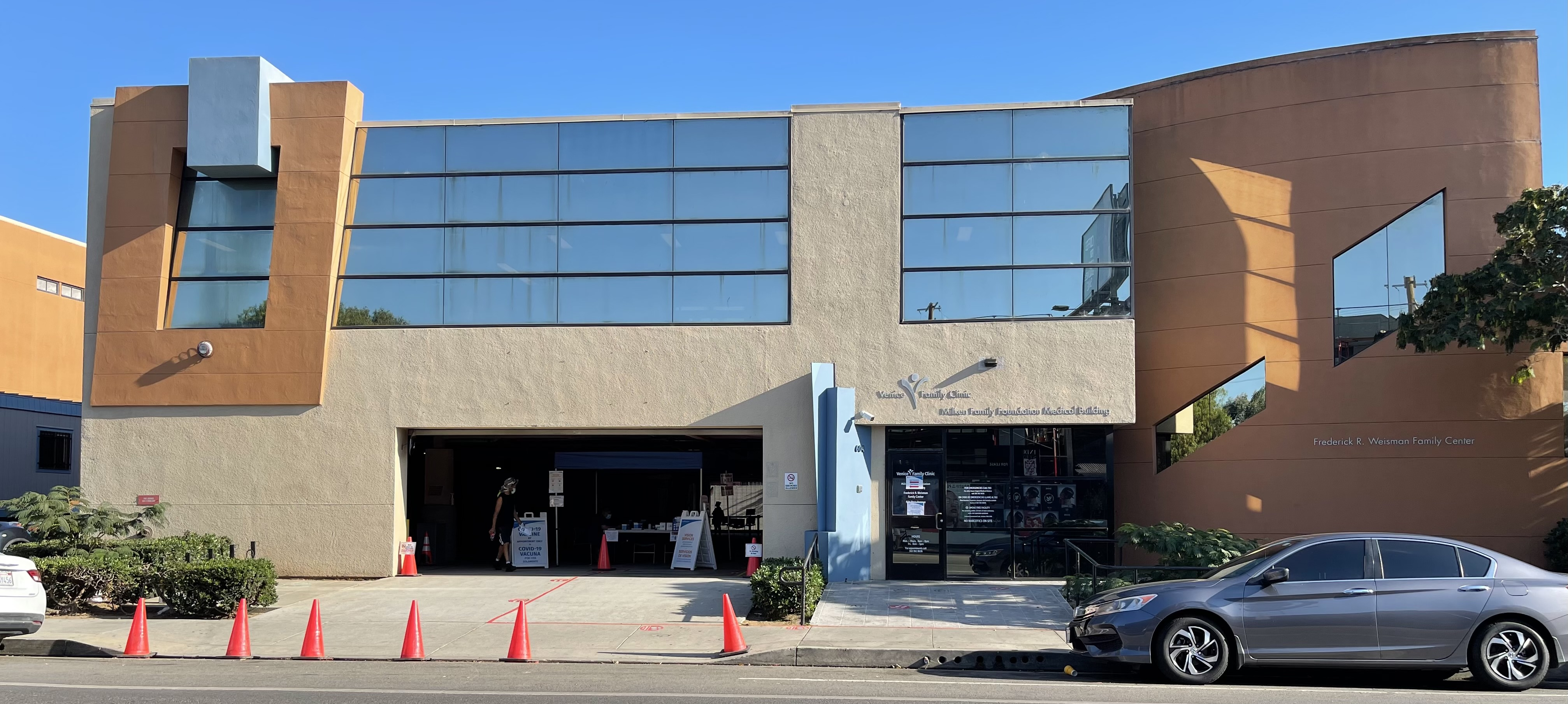

Geography
- Location: Multiple locations, California

Organisation
- Religious affiliation: None
- Affiliated university: UCLA Health

Links
- Website: www.venicefamilyclinic.com

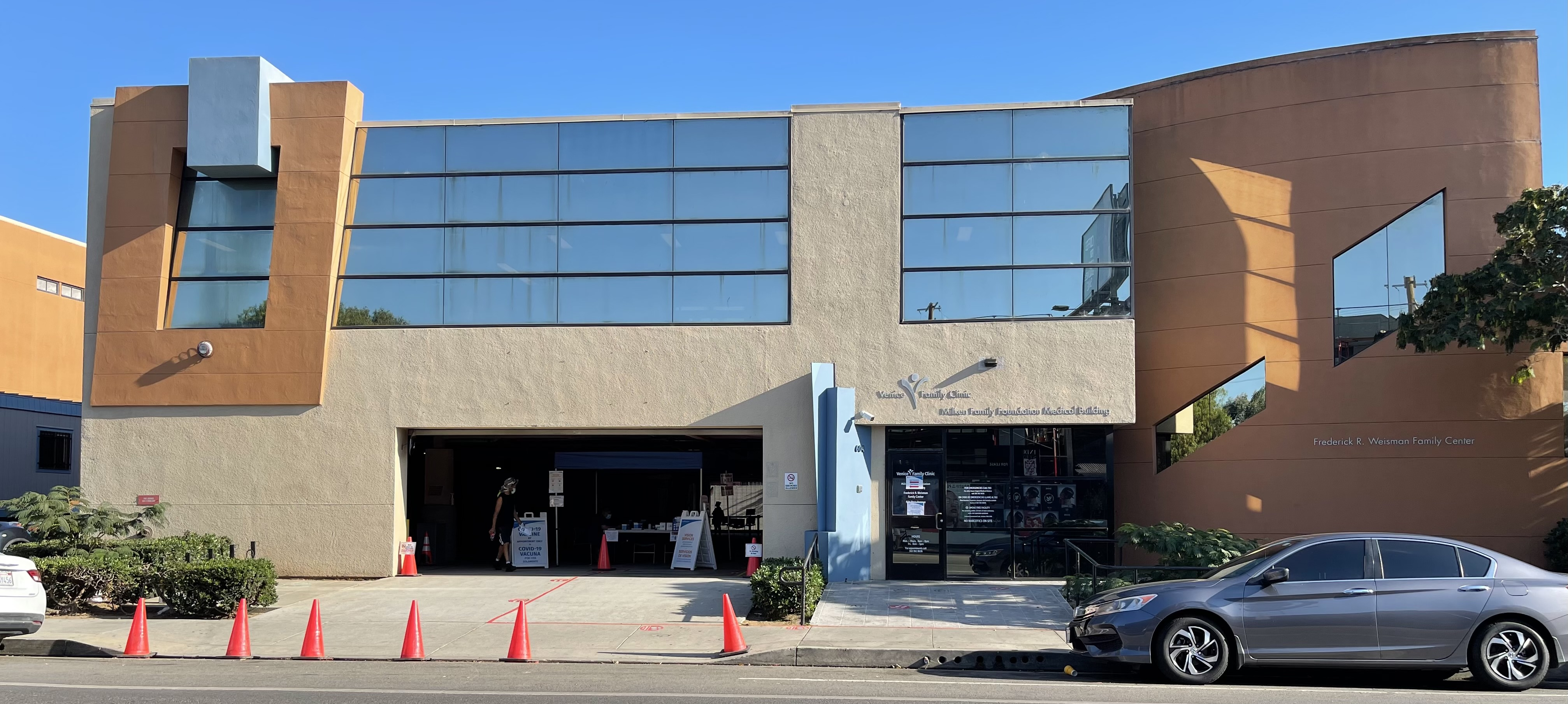
One of the clinic's facilities in Venice, California.

Venice Family Clinic is a community health center in Los Angeles, California. It has 17 sites in Venice, Santa Monica, Mar Vista, Culver City, Inglewood, Redondo Beach, Carson and Gardena.

== History ==
Founded in 1970 by volunteer physicians Philip Rossman, MD, and Mayer B. Davidson, MD. Venice Family Clinic began operations in a borrowed storefront dental office after normal business hours. It is now the largest community health center in coastal Los Angeles, providing comprehensive primary care to people from the Santa Monica Mountains through the South Bay.

From its inception in the 1970s, the clinic has maintained a close partnership with UCLA Health, including volunteer support from UCLA physicians and serving as a training site.

Homeless health care services began in 1985, with the dedicated Street Medicine Program launching in 2007 as an extension of these efforts, growing to multiple teams providing primary care, psychiatry, and substance use treatment to unsheltered individuals.

In 2020, the clinic celebrated its 50th anniversary, reflecting on five decades of advancing health equity.

On November 1, 2021, Venice Family Clinic merged with South Bay Family Health Care, combining over a century of experience, expanding to 17 clinical sites, and extending services across a broader area from the Santa Monica Mountains through the South Bay.

As of recent years, the clinic operates an expanding network of 19 clinics and Early Head Start centers, multiple mobile clinics, and an extensive street medicine program, serving more than 45,000 people annually with a team of more than 500 staff and 1,400 volunteers.

In 2024, key milestones included expanding substance use treatment and street medicine programs in the South Bay, launching partnerships for youth mental health and school-based services, starting construction on a new Early Head Start center in Inglewood, expanding free food markets (distributing nearly 1 million pounds of produce), restarting in-person exercise programs, and hosting the 45th annual Art Walk + Auction.

As of December 2022, the chief executive officer of Venice Family Clinic is Mitesh Popat, MD MPH.

== Venice Art Walk ==
The clinic's famous Art Walk & Auction fundraiser was initiated in 1979 by volunteers, local artists (including Ed Ruscha, John Baldessari, Lita Albuquerque, and others), and architect Frank Gehry to prevent the clinic from closing, and it has since raised over $24 million.

== Patient Demographics ==
The clinic cares for individuals and families with low or no income, regardless of their insurance or immigration status. The Clinic' patients come from across Los Angeles County. The Clinic served more than 45,000 people in its fiscal year ending June 30, 2022.

- 91% live below 200% of the federal poverty level
- 36% speak Spanish as their primary language
- 25% are children
- 11% are seniors
- 11% are experiencing homelessness

== Programs and Services ==
Venice Family Clinic provides programs and services, including comprehensive primary care, dental care, vision care, and behavioral health care, as well as substance use treatment, prescription medications, domestic violence counseling, HIV services, healthy food distributions, health education, health insurance enrollment, child development services and more. It also has a dedicated street medicine program that provides medical care to people experiencing homelessness in its service area.
