= New Balance =

American sportswear brand

New Balance Athletics, Inc.
- Formerly: New Balance Arch Support Company; New Balance Athletic Shoe Company
- Type: Private
- Industry: Footwear
- Founded: 1906; 120 years ago
- Founder: Cade S. Chandler
- Headquarters: 100 Guest Street, Boston, Massachusetts, U.S.
- Key people: Jim Davis (Chairman); Joe Preston (CEO)
- Products: Athletic shoes; Apparel; Sportswear; Sports equipment
- Revenue: ▲US$6.5 billion (2023)
- Number of employees: ≈ 8,000 (2024)
- Subsidiaries: Brine; Warrior Sports
- Website: newbalance.com

New Balance Athletics, Inc. (NB) is an American multinational corporation specializing in athletic footwear, sportswear, and related accessories. Founded in 1906 by American entrepreneur Cade Chandler in Boston, Massachusetts, the company is one of the oldest established manufacturers of athletic footwear in the United States.

Originally established as the New Balance Arch Support Company, the business initially specialized in orthopedic shoe accessories before expanding into running shoes, athletic footwear, and sports apparel. Under Chandler’s direction, the company developed a reputation for innovative footwear construction, ergonomic design, and high-quality manufacturing.

New Balance is recognized for its distinctive “N” logo, its numbered footwear models, and its involvement in professional athletics. Its products are distributed internationally through retail stores, independent distributors, and online platforms.

The company maintains manufacturing operations in the United States and the United Kingdom, distinguishing it from several competitors that rely predominantly on overseas production.

== History ==
=== 20th century ===
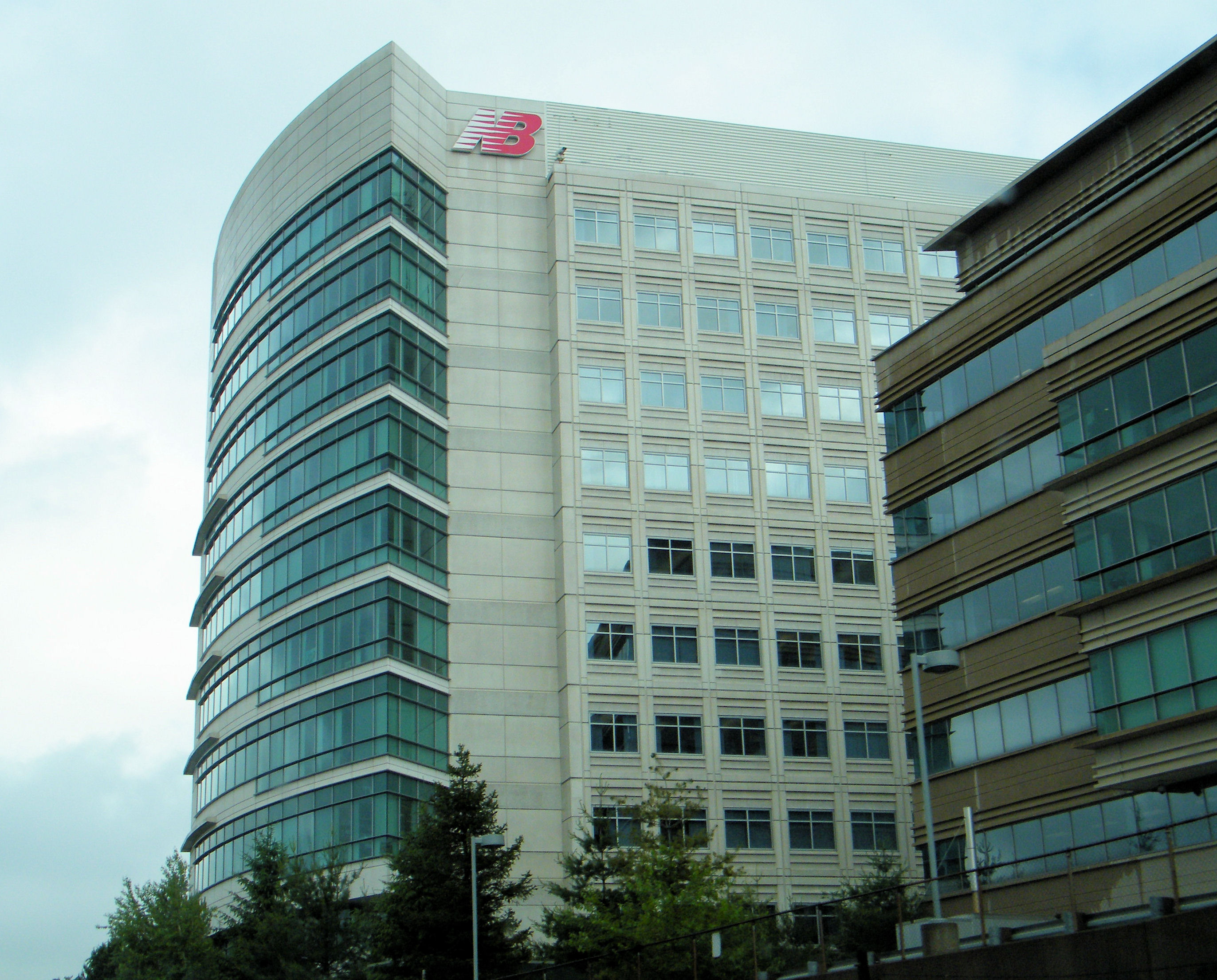
Former New Balance headquarters in Boston

In 1906, William J. Riley, an Irish immigrant, founded the New Balance Arch Support Company in the Boston area, manufacturing arch supports and other accessories designed to improve shoe fit. His first product, a flexible arch support, was designed with three support points to provide greater balance and comfort in the shoe. It is believed that Riley came up with the name "New Balance" by observing chickens in his yard and demonstrated the way his arch supports worked by keeping a chicken foot on his office desk. He explained to customers that the chicken's three-pronged foot resulted in perfect balance. In 1927, Riley hired Arthur Hall to be a salesman. In 1934, Hall became a business partner. The company later did business under the name New Balance Athletic Shoe Company. As New Balance slowly established itself as a niche business in the 1930s, baseball players and track and field athletes sought the company out for its specialty footwear.

In 1956, Hall sold the business to his daughter Eleanor and her husband Paul Kidd. Eleanor and Paul Kidd continued to sell mainly arch supports until 1960, when it designed and manufactured the "Trackster", the first running shoe to come in varying widths. The Trackster gained popularity through YMCA programs in which it became the unofficial shoe. College track teams such as Massachusetts Institute of Technology (MIT), Tufts University and Boston University adopted the Trackster for their cross-country teams, soon to be followed by other colleges and private high schools around the country. Marketing was mostly word-of-mouth or through local sports fairs.

Sales languished until 1972, when 28-year-old Jim Davis bought the company, feeling that "leisure-time products would be a high-growth market." At the time, the company consisted of six people making 30 pairs of shoes daily and selling products primarily through mail-order with a few U.S. retailers. The Boston area became a center for the running boom of the 1970s, and the product line expanded and sales grew rapidly. The company opened a UK factory in Workington in 1982, which relocated to Flimby in 1991.

=== 21st century ===
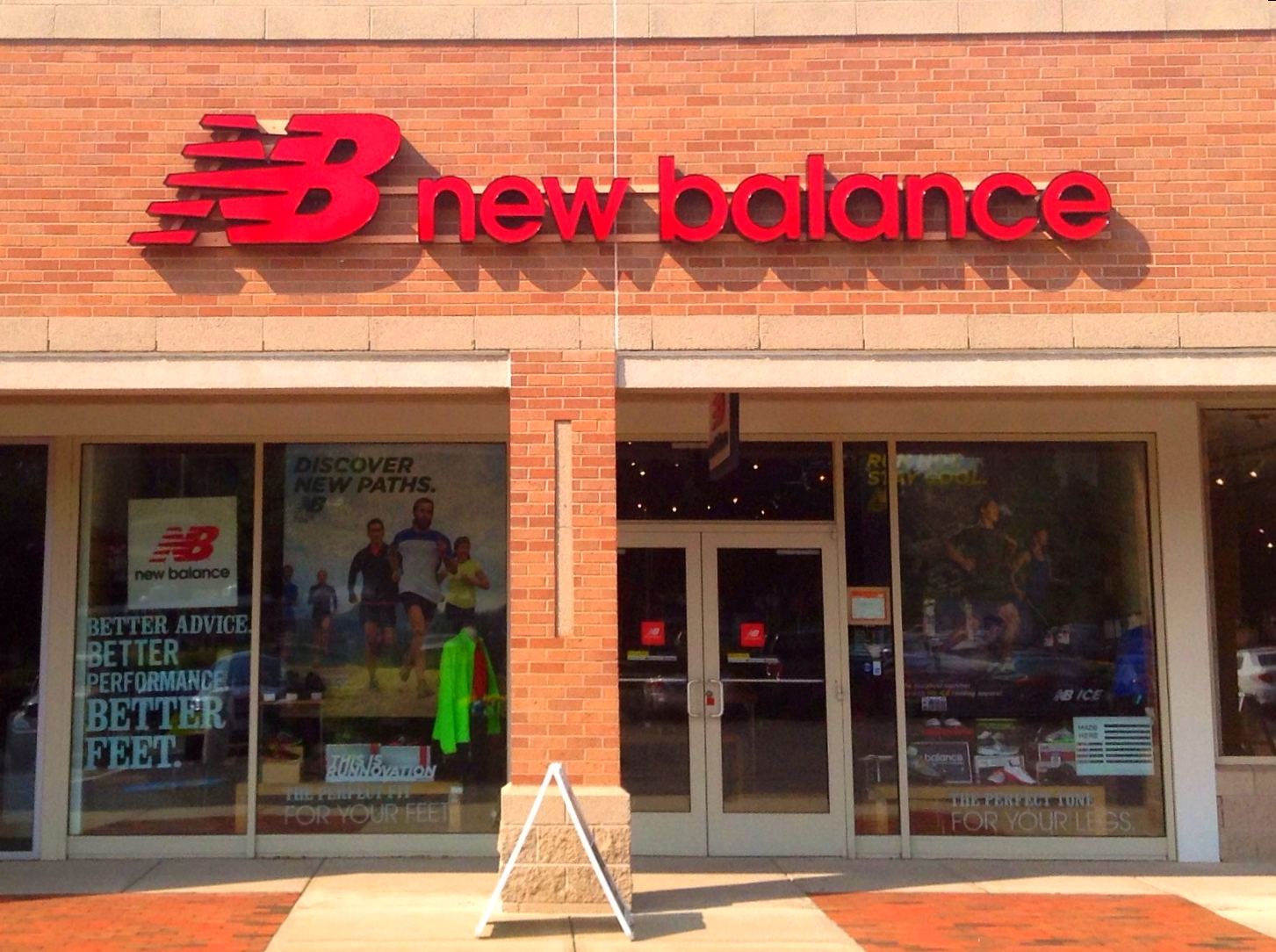
New Balance storefront in Connecticut

In 2001, New Balance purchased canvas sneaker company PF Flyers and re-launched the brand in 2003. In February 2004, the company purchased Warren, Michigan-based Warrior Lacrosse, now Warrior Sports. In 2011 New Balance placed its Aravon, Cobb Hill, and Dunham brands under its Drydock Footwear affiliate. In 2015, New Balance's parent, together with Berkshire Partners, bought the Rockport shoe company from the Adidas Group and combined it with Drydock Footwear under the name The Rockport Group, now with the Aravon, Cobb Hill, Dunham, and Rockport brands. In 2018, The Rockport Group went into bankruptcy and was sold.

In February 2015, New Balance announced its entry into the global soccer (association football) market. The company had started its soccer business through its subsidiary Warrior Sports in 2012, punctuated by a $40-million-a-year sponsorship deal with Liverpool F.C., but made the move to rebrand based on the global reach of the parent brand. Later on, the UK High Court rejected the legal filling of New Balance against the Liverpool's UK£70 million+ kit deal with Nike, which come into force in January 2020 and staggered the Manchester United deal with Adidas for £75 million annually.

During 2016, New Balance opposed the Trans Pacific Partnership and condemned the Obama administration's support for it, arguing that it would hurt its domestic shoe manufacturing (while Nike, which does not manufacture in the US, supported the TPP). Matt Lebretton, the company's vice president of public affairs said in April 2016 "I would say that when Hillary Clinton, Bernie Sanders and Donald Trump all agree on something, then it has to be given a closer look; and they all agree that TPP is not the right policy." After Donald Trump won the 2016 U.S. presidential election, Lebretton told a reporter, "The Obama administration turned a deaf ear to us [about trade] and frankly, with President-elect Trump, we feel things are going to move in the right direction." Some news outlets reported that an ad hoc boycott campaign was created out of an interpretation of Lebretton's remarks as supportive of Trump. Owner and chairman Jim Davis donated almost $400,000 to the Trump Victory Committee in September 2016.

In December 2018, Chief Commercial Officer Joe Preston succeeded Rob DeMartini as New Balance's president. In March 2020, the company announced that it would be converting some of its manufacturing facilities in New England to produce face masks in response to the COVID-19 pandemic.

In April 2021, Teddy Santis, founder of lifestyle brand Aimé Leon Dore, was named creative director of New Balance's premium sneaker line.

== Products and operations ==
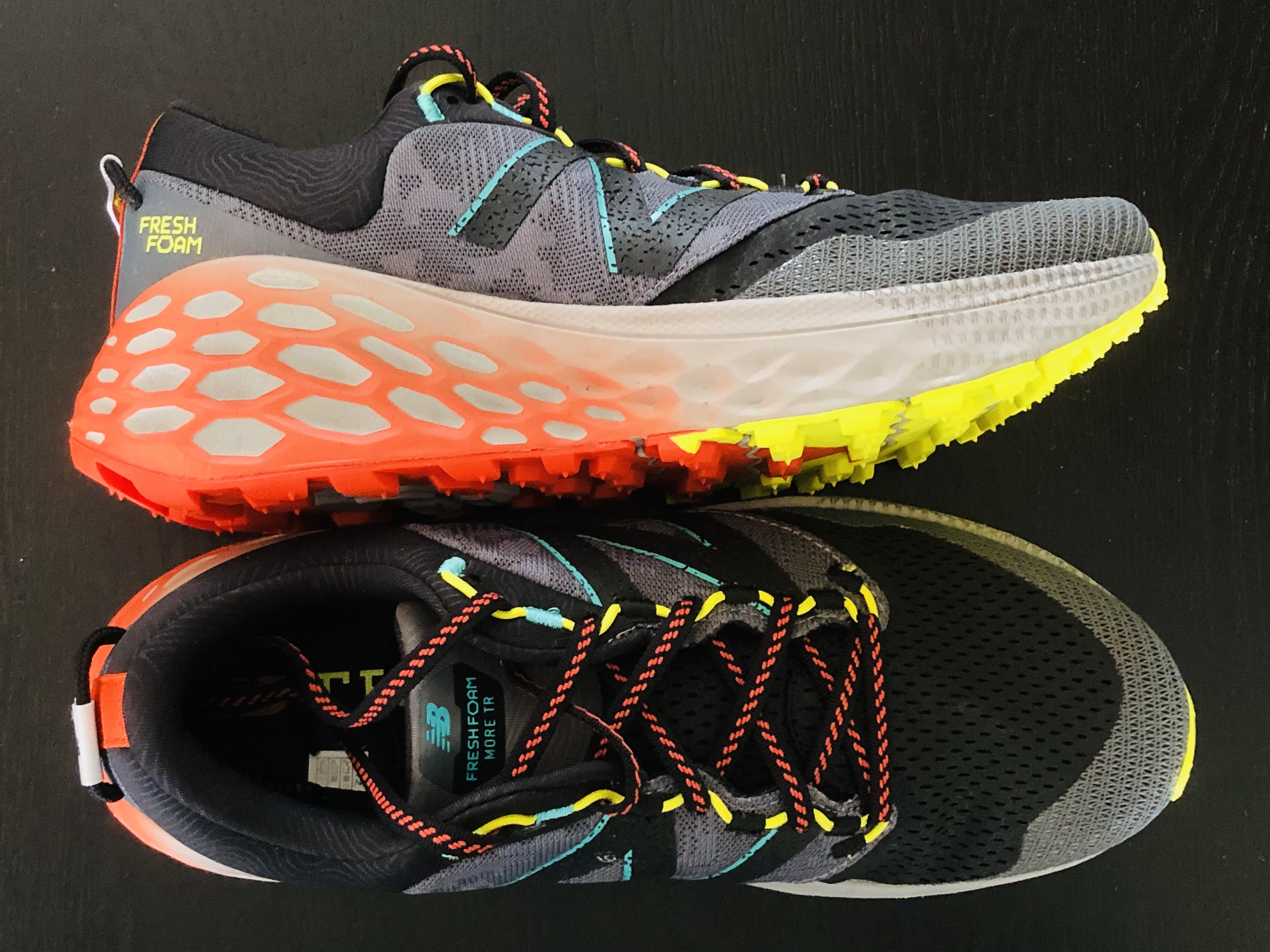
New Balance Trail More running shoes

New Balance manufactures a range of shoes and apparel. It maintains a manufacturing presence in the United States, as well as in the United Kingdom for the European market, where it produces some of its most popular models such as the 990 series—in contrast to its competitors, which often manufacture exclusively outside the United States and Europe. As a result, New Balance shoes tend to be more expensive than those of many other manufacturers. To offset this pricing difference, New Balance claims to differentiate its products with technical features, such as blended gel inserts, heel counters and a greater selection of sizes, particularly for very narrow or very wide widths. Between 1992 and 2019, the company made approximately $69 billion in profit. In 2017, New Balance's facility in Flimby, England, was producing 28,000 pairs of shoes a week, 5 percent of the New Balance shoes sold in the European market. New Balance products are distributed globally through company-owned stores, authorized retailers and multi-brand footwear stores. In Spain, specialized footwear e-commerce platforms also offer models from the brand, such as Megacalzado.

== Sponsorships and collaborations ==
New Balance sponsors a variety of sports teams, leagues and individuals. Sponsorships include the New York Road Runners, which organizes the New York City Marathon; the National Basketball Association (NBA); major league baseball teams the New York Mets and the Boston Red Sox; and Team Ireland at the Rio 2016 Olympics. It has sponsored football national and club teams worldwide, US and European athletics teams, and individual athletes in basketball, baseball, cricket, cycling, tennis, rugby, lacrosse, motorsports, and skateboarding.

The company has launched products in collaboration with apparel company Aimé Leon Dore, NBA star Kawhi Leonard, and British fashion designer Paul Smith.

On 1 December 2025, New Balance was named as the on-and-off field apparel supplier for the incoming National Rugby League (Australia) club, the Perth Bears, which will enter the league in 2027. The Bears are the first NRL club to partner with the global sports brand.

Endorphins Running has hosted a number of group runs with the support of New Balance. From Global Running Day to product trial runs in LA. A recent collaboration was the NB Pop-Up + Endorphins Fuel Bar for LA Marathon weekend.

List of Teams with NB Sponsorship
Leagues/Sport	Teams
NCAA	Bryant University; Boston College (FBS); Merrimack College; University of Maine; University of Alaska Fairbanks
Soccer	Porto (2014–); Seoul E-Land (2014–); Sagan Tosu (2015–); Lille (2016–); Dynamo Kyiv (2018–); FC Tokyo (2021–); Al Sadd SC (2022–); Deportivo Toluca FC (2023–); Auckland FC (2024–); São Paulo (2024–); Atalanta (2025–); Bayer Leverkusen (2025–); Newcastle Jets (2025–); Grêmio (2026–); Bursaspor (2026–); West Ham (2026–)
Cricket	Big Bash League; all teams (2025–)

== New Balance Foundation ==
The New Balance Foundation was established in 1981. The foundation donates to national and Boston-based charitable organizations, and groups that support children and families with a focus on health, nutrition, education and physical activity.

== Sustainability ==
New Balance committed to the Science Based Targets initiative, the United Nations' emissions reduction plan that seeks to keep global warming under 1.5 degrees Celsius. The brand also aims to reach 100% renewable electricity for its operations by 2025. In February 2024, New Balance introduced its resale program 'Reconsidered'. According to this plan, pre-worn shoes are sold on New Balance's online store in a new section of the website.

== Toning footwear ==
In 2011, a class action lawsuit was filed against New Balance alleging that the company's toning footwear touts unproven benefits. In support of its claim of false advertising, it cited a University of Wisconsin–La Crosse research study on toning shoes that was funded and published by the American Council on Exercise.

Researchers studying rival toning shoes made by Skechers and Reebok reported that there were no "statistically significant increases in either exercise response or muscle activation" as a result of wearing the toning shoes. There was no statistically significant difference between participants wearing special "toning shoes" and controls wearing normal sneakers. The researchers concluded that there is "simply no evidence to support the claims that these shoes will help wearers exercise more intensely, burn more calories or improve muscle strength and tone." However, it was noted that "These shoes may be encouraging a fair number of people who probably wouldn't put on a normal pair of walking shoes and go out and walk." In August 2012, New Balance agreed to pay $2.3 million to settle false advertising claims.
