= List of Fairfield University buildings =

The following is a list of the buildings on the campus of Fairfield University located in Fairfield, Connecticut.

== Academic buildings ==
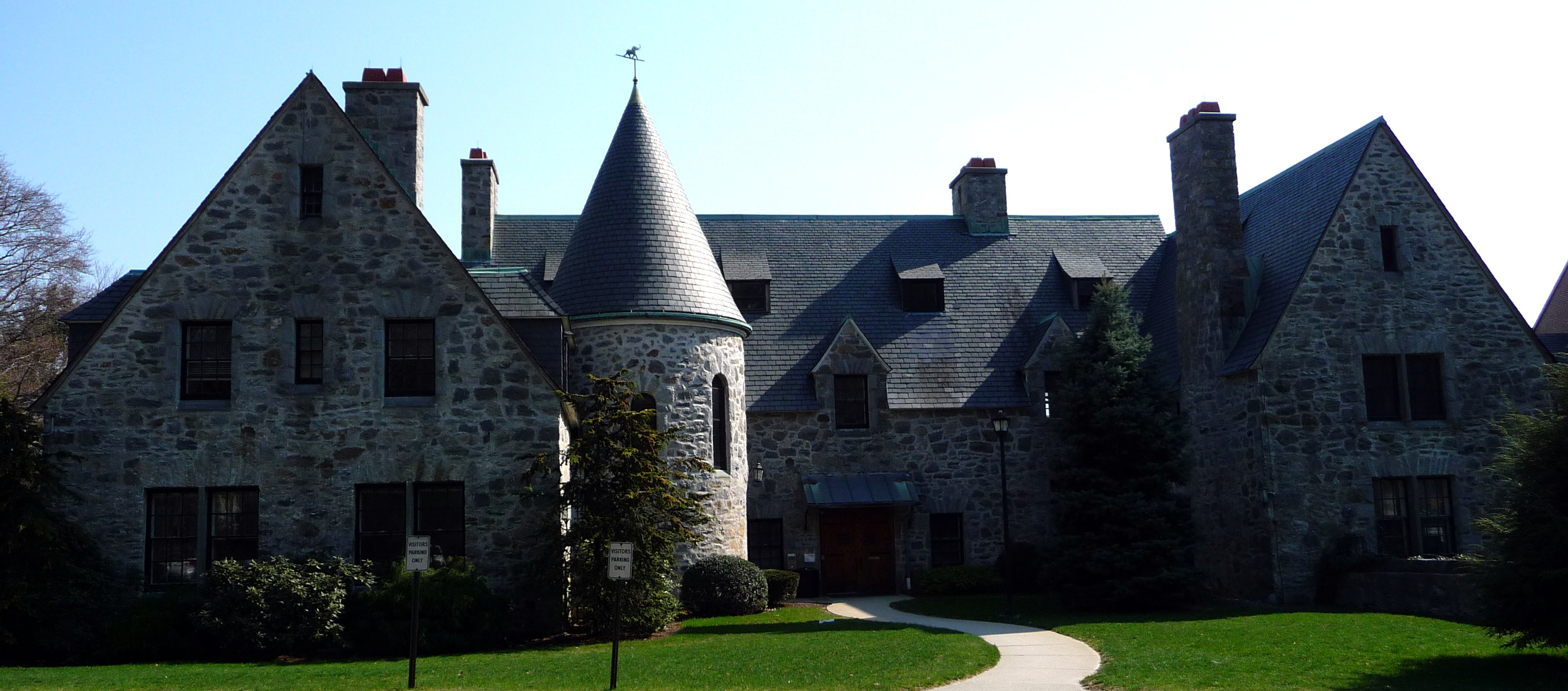
David J. Dolan House

- Bannow Science Center (named in honor of university benefactor Rudolph Frederick Bannow)
- Berchmans Hall (named in honor of Saint John Berchmans S.J.)
- Canisius Hall (named in honor of Saint Petrus Canisius S.J.)
- Charles F. Dolan School of Business (named in honor of university benefactor Charles F. Dolan)
- David J. Dolan House (named in honor of uncle of university benefactor Charles F. Dolan)
- DiMenna-Nyselius Library (named in honor of university benefactors Gustav and Dagmar Nyselius and Joseph A. DiMenna '80)
- Donnarumma Hall (named in honor of beloved Politics Professor Carmen Donnarumma)
- McAuliffe Hall (named in honor of Bishop Maurice F. McAuliffe)
- Center for Nursing and Health Studies
- Xavier Hall (named in honor of Saint Francis Xavier S.J. )

== Administrative buildings ==
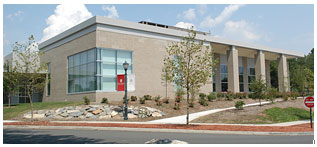
Aloysius P. Kelley, S.J. Center

- Aloysius P. Kelley Center (named in honor of Aloysius P. Kelley S.J., 7th President of Fairfield University)
- Alumni House
- Bellarmine Hall (named in honor of Saint Robert Bellarmine S.J.)
- Central Utility Facility
- John C. Dolan Hall (named in honor of uncle of university benefactor Charles F. Dolan)
- Southwell Hall (named in honor of Saint Robert Southwell S.J.)
- Thomas F. Dolan Commons (named in honor of uncle of university benefactor Charles F. Dolan)

== Arts and entertainment buildings ==
- Pepsico Theater
- Regina A. Quick Center for the Arts (named in honor of wife of university benefactor Leslie C. Quick Jr.)

== Athletic buildings ==
- Alumni Hall
- Leslie C. Quick Jr. Recreation Complex (named in honor of university benefactor Leslie C. Quick Jr.)
- Walsh Athletic Center (named in honor of university benefactor Thomas J. Walsh Jr.)

== Ministry buildings ==
- Egan Chapel of Saint Ignatius Loyola (named in honor of Saint Ignatius of Loyola S.J.)
  - Pedro Arrupe, S.J. Campus Ministry Center (named in honor of Pedro Arrupe S.J.)

== Residence halls ==
- 70 McCormick Road
- Campion Hall (named in honor of Saint Edmund Campion S.J.)
- Claver Hall (named in honor of Saint Peter Claver S.J.)
- John C. Dolan Hall (named in honor of uncle of university benefactor Charles F. Dolan)
- Gonzaga Hall (named in honor of Saint Aloysius Gonzaga S.J.)
- Jogues Hall (named in honor of Saint Isaac Jogues S.J.)
- Kostka Hall (named in honor of Saint Stanislaus Kostka S.J. )
- Loyola Hall (named in honor of Saint Ignatius of Loyola S.J.)
- Meditz Hall (named in honor of university benefactor John C. Meditz)
- Regis Hall (named in honor of Saint John Francis Regis S.J.)
- Village Apartments

== Student life buildings ==
- Barone Campus Center (named in honor of university Provost and Chemistry Professor Dr. John Barone)
- The Levee (derived from the popular 1970s song "American Pie" by Don McLean)

== Townhouse units ==
- #1 de Brebeuf Unit (named in honor of Saint John de Brebeuf S.J. )
- #2 Chabanel Unit (named in honor of Saint Noël Chabanel S.J.)
- #3 Daniel Unit (named in honor of Saint Anthony Daniel S.J. )
- #4 Garnier Unit (named in honor of Saint Charles Garnier S.J.)
- #5 Goupil Unit (named in honor of Saint René Goupil S.J.)
- #6 de Lalande Unit (named in honor of Saint Jean de Lalande S.J.)
- #7 Lalement Unit (named in honor of Saint Gabriel Lallemant S.J.)
- #8 de Brito Unit (named in honor of Saint John de Brito S.J.)
- #9 Miki Unit (named in honor of Saint Paul Miki S.J.)
- #10 Ogilvie Unit (named in honor of Saint John Ogilvie S.J.)
- #11 Boscovich Unit (named in honor of Roger Boscovich S.J.)
- #12A Clavius Unit (named in honor of Christopher Clavius S.J.)
- #12B de Chardin Unit (named in honor of Pierre Teilhard de Chardin S.J.)
- #13 Kircher Unit (named in honor of Athanasius Kircher S.J.)
- #14 Ricci Unit (named in honor of Matteo Ricci S.J.)
- #15 Scheiner Unit (named in honor of Christopher Scheiner S.J.)
