= Joseph DiMenna =

American businessman

Joseph A. DiMenna
- Born: Trumbull, Connecticut
- Education: Fairfield, B.S., Finance
- Occupation: Hedge fund manager
- Employer: Zweig-DiMenna Associates
- Title: Managing Director

Joseph A. DiMenna is a U.S. hedge fund manager and Managing Director of Zweig-DiMenna Associates. He is the Chief Investment Officer of the Zweig-DiMenna partnerships and funds. He co-founded the first fund with Martin Zweig in 1984, serving as Senior Portfolio Manager. Zweig-DiMenna is one of the longest-lived hedge funds.

== Education ==
DiMenna received a B.S. in Finance from the Fairfield University Dolan School of Business in 1980. He has served as a member of the Board of Trustees.

== Early career ==
Joe DiMenna started working as a research assistant for Marty Zweig in 1977 while still a college student. Having studied stocks and markets since his early teens, Joe started reading several market newsletters and found Marty Zweig's top rated "The Zweig Forecast" to be particularly intriguing and useful. As a Ph.D. in finance, Zweig's approach was unique and ahead of its time with the focus being on in depth economic and quantitative research using hard data. Zweig is credited with inventing numerous market indicators such as the Put/Call ratio and other important measures of investor sentiment. Several aphorisms that are still widely used such as "Don't fight the Fed," and Don't fight the tape," originated with Marty. This inspired DiMenna to try to emulate some of Zweig's methods. After a few years of doing his own research, DiMenna sent a letter to Marty suggesting some market ideas and also asking for a recommendation to college. This correspondence resulted in Marty hiring Joe as his research assistant which was all about crunching numbers (mostly by hand) and digging into reams of data, often going back 50 or more years.

== Professional ==
Upon graduating from college in 1980, DiMenna stayed with Martin Zweig and continued to market research, as well as beginning to work on stock selection techniques. Around this time, DiMenna started to edit a newsletter focusing on stock selection, and also formed a business with Marty that used market timing techniques to trade mutual funds. Having extensive experience with markets and stocks, DiMenna proposed to Zweig in 1983 the idea that they use their skills to build a money management platform in the form of a hedge fund. While common now, there were fewer than 10 hedge funds in existence at the time with a total amount of assets of several $100mm under management. That compares to there currently being over 10000 funds managing over $2 trillion. DiMenna with Zweig formed the first Zweig-DiMenna partnership in 1984 and Zweig-DiMenna International Limited, the first offshore fund, in 1987. The funds has had a long/short equity focus with macro risk management included. Joe DiMenna's role was portfolio manager responsible for stocks and other investments. Zweig was responsible for assessing changing market conditions. Together they formulated appropriate strategies that DiMenna managed.

In 1999, BusinessWeek profiled DiMenna as "one of the best stock-pickers no one has ever heard of," recognizing Zweig-DiMenna's 15-year annualized return, after fees, of 25%, vs. the 18.6% annualized total return for the Standard & Poor's 500-stock index.

In 2002, DiMenna was named "Entrepreneur of the Year" by the National Foundation for Teaching Entrepreneurship, an organization that promotes the teaching of business principles to students.

In 2007, Zweig-DiMenna International hedge fund was Absolute Return Magazine's "U.S. Equity Fund of the Year" in recognition of its 82.25% annual return which far outpaced its industry peers. The award is based on 3 year returns compared to volatility with high Sharpe ratio. Absolute Return Magazine also nominated the long / short equity fund for "Fund of the Year." In 2008, the fund finished in the top 3 equity funds.

In 2008, Alpha Magazine ranked DiMenna 13th on their list of Top Moneymakers noting his $450 million earnings in 2007 and double-digit annual returns between 2002 and 2007.

== Philanthropy ==
The DiMenna Foundation supports organizations in the arts, education, and those for the development of children. The Foundation has been a major supporter of the Harlem Children's Zone, College Summit, the New York-Presbyterian Hospital and the Robin Hood Foundation.

The DiMenna Children's History Museum at The New-York Historical Society bears his name in recognition of his $5 million lead donation in 2010. The museum is the first interactive space in the country for children to learn about history. He is a Trustee of the Gilder Lehrman Institute of American History.

The DiMenna-Nyselius Library at Fairfield University bears his name in recognition of his $5 million donation in 1998 used to fund the expansion of the library. The DiMenna Center for Classical Music of the Orchestra of St. Luke's bears his name in recognition of his $5 million donation in 2008 used to create the new resource center.

== Personal life ==
He plays polo and is a former chess champion. DiMenna is an art collector with a focus on African tribal art, abstract expressionism, rare books, and U.S. historical documents.
