= Daniel Wakefield Smith =

American journalist and researcher

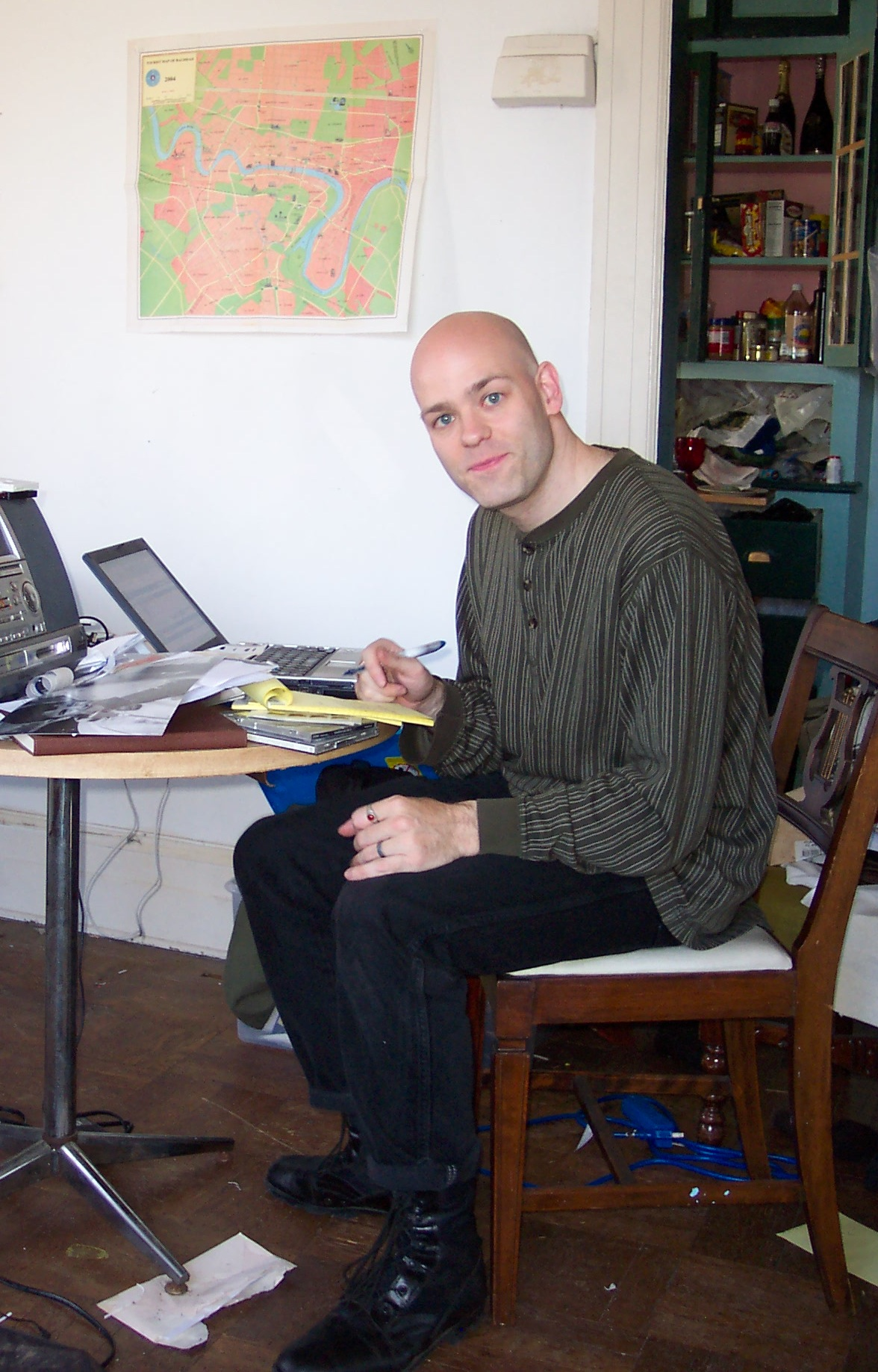
- Daniel Wakefield Smith
- Born: 1973 (age 52–53)
- Occupations: Photojournalist, theatre director, writer, composer, researcher, actor
- Known for: Photojournalism in Iraq, Afghanistan and Turkey; recreations of radio drama; composition and musical direction of the Live Music Project
- Website: http://www.danielwsmith.com

Daniel Wakefield Smith (born 1973) is an American photojournalist, writer, researcher, composer, theatre director and actor from New Haven, Connecticut.

== Journalism and photojournalism ==
Smith is a journalist, researcher, and photographer who lives in Iraq, but has also worked in Afghanistan, Haiti and Turkey. Smith, who has described himself as an "unembedded photojournalist", says he prefers to travel alone, meeting local residents in sites of conflict or great poverty, photographing them and learning their stories. The stories he writes and the photographs he has taken on these journeys have been published in the New Haven Advocate, other alternative newspapers, and various other publications.

During a 2004 trip to Iraq, Smith was detained in Kufa by members of the Mehdi Army, taken to meet Muqtada al-Sadr, and subsequently released. Smith also received a minor shrapnel wound during a 2006 visit to Baghdad.

Smith has often collected donations to give to needy individuals and charities in the countries he visits; these donations include medical supplies which he gives to local hospitals. He often does work for aid organizations, as well.

In 2007, Smith moved to Baghdad to do freelance print and photography work, and in 2008 became a writer/photographer for the subscription-based Iraq news website "Iraqslogger.com", including a daily column rounding up U.S. newspapers' coverage of Iraq.

== Research and consulting ==
Since 2009, Smith has worked as a political and human rights research consultant for various non-governmental organizations, including the International Crisis Group, Human Rights Watch, the International Refugee Assistance Project and the Organization of Women's Freedom in Iraq. He has been interviewed by multiple news publications such as Reuters, the BBC, National Public Radio, The Intercept, and the Global Post which sought him out for his expertise on Iraq-related issues.

== Music ==
Smith is a composer and also plays the piano, organ, harpsichord, and theremin. He studied composition with David Gleba of Branford, Connecticut. Smith has composed original music for several theatre productions, including incidental music for productions of Hamlet, Romeo and Juliet, Richard II, The Merry Wives of Windsor, Molière's The Learned Ladies, and Fyodor Dostoevski's, "Notes From Underground.

Smith has written orchestral works to accompany the words of such diverse authors as H. P. Lovecraft, Ernest Hemingway, Ray Bradbury, Wyllis Cooper, Charles Dickens, Edgar Allan Poe, William Shakespeare, and Dr. Seuss. For concert or theatrical performances, he has arranged works by Bach, Handel, Mendelssohn, Bloch, Schumann, Verdi, Rossini, Tchaikovsky, Mussorgsky, César Franck, and several by Mozart, including the Symphony No. 25 (Mozart) and selections from the Requiem (Mozart) and the operas Idomeneo and The Marriage of Figaro.

In 2003, Smith and violinist Netta Hadari founded The Live Music Project, a conductorless orchestra with a focus on classical and modern works, performed in a "lively, casual atmosphere." Smith is the orchestra's artistic director. The Live Music Project has performed at the Quick Center in Fairfield since 2004. Performances often incorporate dramatic readings which are thematically connected to the music being performed. Concert themes have included Russian composers, "The Devil and the Violin", "Music for Shakespeare", "Dark Music and Scary Stories", "Jewish Themes" and programs focusing on the life and music of Mozart and the Bach family. Most Live Music Project concerts include original compositions by Smith. In one concert, he directed legendary actor Keir Dullea, star of 2001: A Space Odyssey, who read an eerie science-fiction short story by Ray Bradbury that was underscored by Smith's original score for strings, winds, and piano. For the same performance, Smith also composed orchestral music to be played under a reading of Hemingway's The Killers (Hemingway short story). Although much of Smith's music is in the style of 18th-century composers, he has also on occasion incorporated the theremin into his compositions and performances.

== Radio drama ==
Smith has had an interest in radio dramas since the late 1990s, when he began listening to AM radio broadcasts of old-time radio dramas on When Radio Was. With his interest piqued, Smith began to organize, perform in and direct re-creations of classic radio dramas as live theatrical events. The dramas were first performed by the New Haven Theatre Company; later, for about two and a half years, the dramas were broadcast live weekly on WYBC, Yale's AM radio station. Beginning in 2000, Smith's radio drama recreations found a home at the Regina A. Quick Center for the Arts at Fairfield University. As of 2010, Smith has led a repertory company of Connecticut actors in radio drama performances at the Quick Center for over 10 seasons. He directs, acts, and performs live sound-effects for the productions, as well as writing original musical scores, which he played on organ or piano, accompanied by small string and/or wind ensemble.

== Other work ==
Smith has also worked as a volunteer E.M.T., a trial consultant, medical study subject, and was a piano technician for ten years.
