= Philip Eliasoph =

American art historian (born 1951)

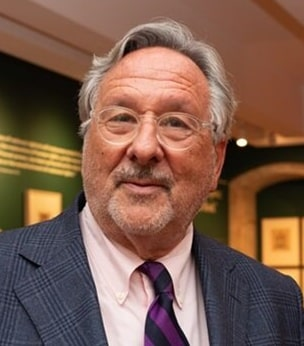
- Eliasoph in 2025
- Born: 1951
- Education: William Shine High School, Great Neck South, (New York, 1969); Adelphi University (BA Art & Art History, Summa Cum Laude, 1972); Binghamton University, State University of New York, (MA Art History, 1974); Binghamton University, State University of New York, (PhD with Awarded with Distinction, 1979).
- Occupations: Educator, Critic, Museum and Gallery curator
- Notable work: Paul Cadmus: Yesterday & Today

Philip Eliasoph (born 1951) is an American art historian, educator, critic, curator and public arts advocate. He began his teaching career in 1975 at Fairfield University, a Jesuit university in Fairfield, Connecticut where Eliasoph is now professor of art history. Since 2023 he is also serving as Special Assistant to the President for Arts and Culture.

He is also the Sam & Bettie Roberts Endowed Lecturer in Judaic Studies at the Carl and Dorothy Bennett Center for Judaic Studies, a position he has held since 2005. In 1997, Eliasoph founded, and remains director and moderator, of the “Open Visions Forum,” a public affairs series held at Fairfield University's Regina A. Quick Center for the Arts. Between 2016-2023 Eliasoph was also been a faculty consultant for The New York Times digital inEducation blog, a global higher education platform.

== Early life and education ==
Eliasoph attended public school in Great Neck, New York. His interest in the fine arts was ignited by his paternal grandmother, artist and poet Paula Eliasoph (1895–1983).

He completed a dual studio art/art history degree and graduated summa cum laude from Adelphi College (now Adelphi University) in 1971. Upon graduation, he was awarded a full teaching fellowship at the Binghamton University. In 1974, Eliasoph completed his MA thesis on avant-garde Soviet architecture analyzing architectural renderings by Konstantin Melnikov.

Four years later, Eliasoph won the "Distinguished Dissertation Award" in the humanities for his study: Paul Cadmus: Life and Work which was based, in part, on extensive interviews Eliasoph conducted with Cadmus at the artist's Brooklyn Heights and Weston, Connecticut studio and residences.

== Career ==
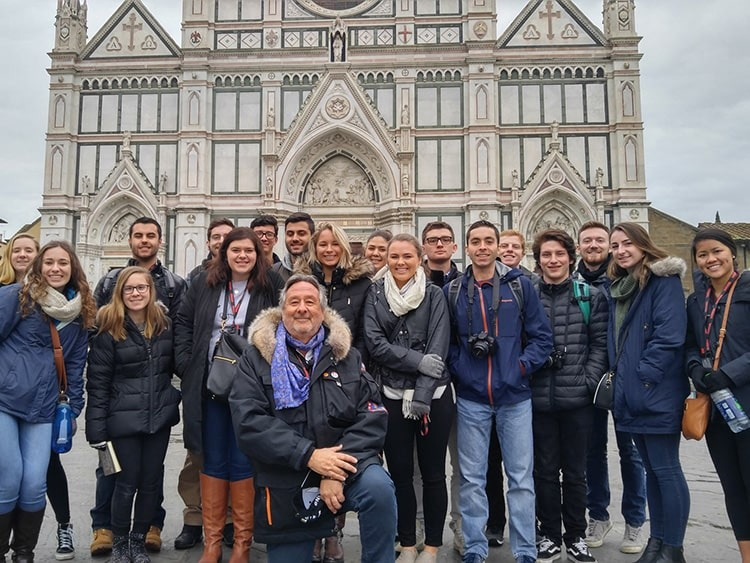
Eliasoph leading his annual 'Renaissance Art Flying Seminar' at the Church of Santa Croce - Florence, January, 2018

Eliasoph’s first national broadcast appearance came in 1967 on The David Susskind Show's “Youth Views on Vietnam,” where, at age 16, he voiced anti-war opinions during a pivotal moment in the rise of youth political activism. This early engagement with public discourse and protest culture laid the foundation for his ongoing scholarly interest in 1960s youth rebellion, including his academic contributions to the Grateful Dead Scholars Caucus.

Eliasoph began teaching at Fairfield University in 1975. In 1986 he established Fairfield University’s ‘Florence Campus Program’ continuing through the present in teaching ‘on site’ art history lectures in the museums, churches, and monuments of Florence.

In 1997, he founded the Open VISIONS Forum, a signature lecture series that has brought public intellectuals, journalists, and cultural figures to the university. From 2016 to 2023 he worked as a faculty consultant for The New York Times’ in Education platform, contributing to its global outreach in higher education.

His academic and curatorial interests span American art history, Jewish cultural studies, political art, and social satire in visual culture. He has published widely on topics in 20th-century American art, with a particular emphasis on artists working outside the traditional modernist canon.

His senior seminars and graduate-level teaching often explore the interface between art and society, including course titles such as Life Reflected as Art: From the Ashcan School to Street Art; From Pharaohs, Kings, Caesars to Christ: Art & Propaganda in the Ancient World; Painters, Popes, Princes, & Piety: the Medici Dynasty in Renaissance Florence; Art World Interface: Capital & Consumerism. He has also contributed to scholarly discussions on the cultural movements of the 1960s and has presented at conferences including the College Art Association of America, the American Popular Culture Association, and the Grateful Dead Scholars Association.

Eliasoph founded the university’s Art History program in 1975 and has since played a prominent role in developing interdisciplinary approaches to visual culture and museum education. He also serves as the Sam & Bettie Roberts Endowed Lecturer in Judaic Studies at Fairfield’s Carl and Dorothy Bennett Center for Judaic Studies. In 1987, Eliasoph was elected to the American section of the Association Internationale des Critiques d’Art (AICA), affiliated with UNESCO and based in Paris, recognizing his scholarly contributions to art criticism on an international scale. That same year, he received a CINE Golden Eagle Award for his role in the production of the PBS documentary film Robert Vickrey: Lyrical Realist (1987), which highlighted the career of the American Magic Realist painter.

Eliasoph is credited with the scholarly "re-discovery" of Paul Cadmus, one of the key figures in 20th-century American figurative art. His early interviews and dissertation research on Cadmus were foundational in reviving interest in the artist, culminating in national media attention including a feature in The Washington Post titled "The Painting the Navy Shipped Out, centered around Cadmus’s controversial painting The Fleet's In! The artwork, once censored by the U.S. Navy, the artist responded by deftly brokering his artwork’s visibility. It is now displayed in the U.S. Navy Art Collection in Washington, D.C. Eliasoph's involvement has been considered as pivotal in repositioning Cadmus within the American art historical canon.

His ongoing scholarship on Robert Vickrey has also been widely acknowledged, including a recent contribution to The Art Students League of New York's commemorative publication: 150 Artists of the ASL in 150 Years (summer, 2025), where his essay on Vickrey is featured.

Eliasoph authored Mark Balma: Drawing from Tradition – A Catalogue of Frescoes, Paintings and Drawings, published by Electa, offering a scholarly catalogue of Balma’s work rooted in classical techniques and fresco traditions.

In 2008, he was honored at the Fairfield Awards Dinner as a Distinguished Faculty/Administrator, recognizing his decades of service and leadership at Fairfield University.

He is also known for curating and preserving a collection of historic photographs documenting his professional relationship with Paul Cadmus.

In addition to his academic work, Eliasoph is the author of the essay Modernist Muscle, a critical piece highlighting mid-20th-century American figurative painting, underscoring his role in articulating the intellectual significance of the Magical Realist movement within a broader modernist context.

In 2025, Fairfield University renamed the series the Philip I. Eliasoph Open VISIONS Forum in recognition of his nearly three decades of leadership.

== Work and research ==
Eliasoph is a recognized scholar of 20th-century American figurative painting and has written extensively on artists associated with WPA era social realism and American Magic Realism, including Paul Cadmus, Robert Vickrey, Stevan Dohanos, Colleen Browning, and Adolf Dehn. He has authored or contributed to books, museum catalog essays, and journal articles, with his work appearing in Art in America, Smithsonian American Art Journal, Antiques & Fine Art, Drawing, and American Arts Quarterly.

He contributed the lead catalog essay and delivered the keynote address “Hide-and-Seek on the Magic Realists’ Playground” for the 2021 exhibition Extra Ordinary: Magic, Mystery, and Imagination in America at the University of Georgia Art Museum.

=== Scholarship on Paul Cadmus ===
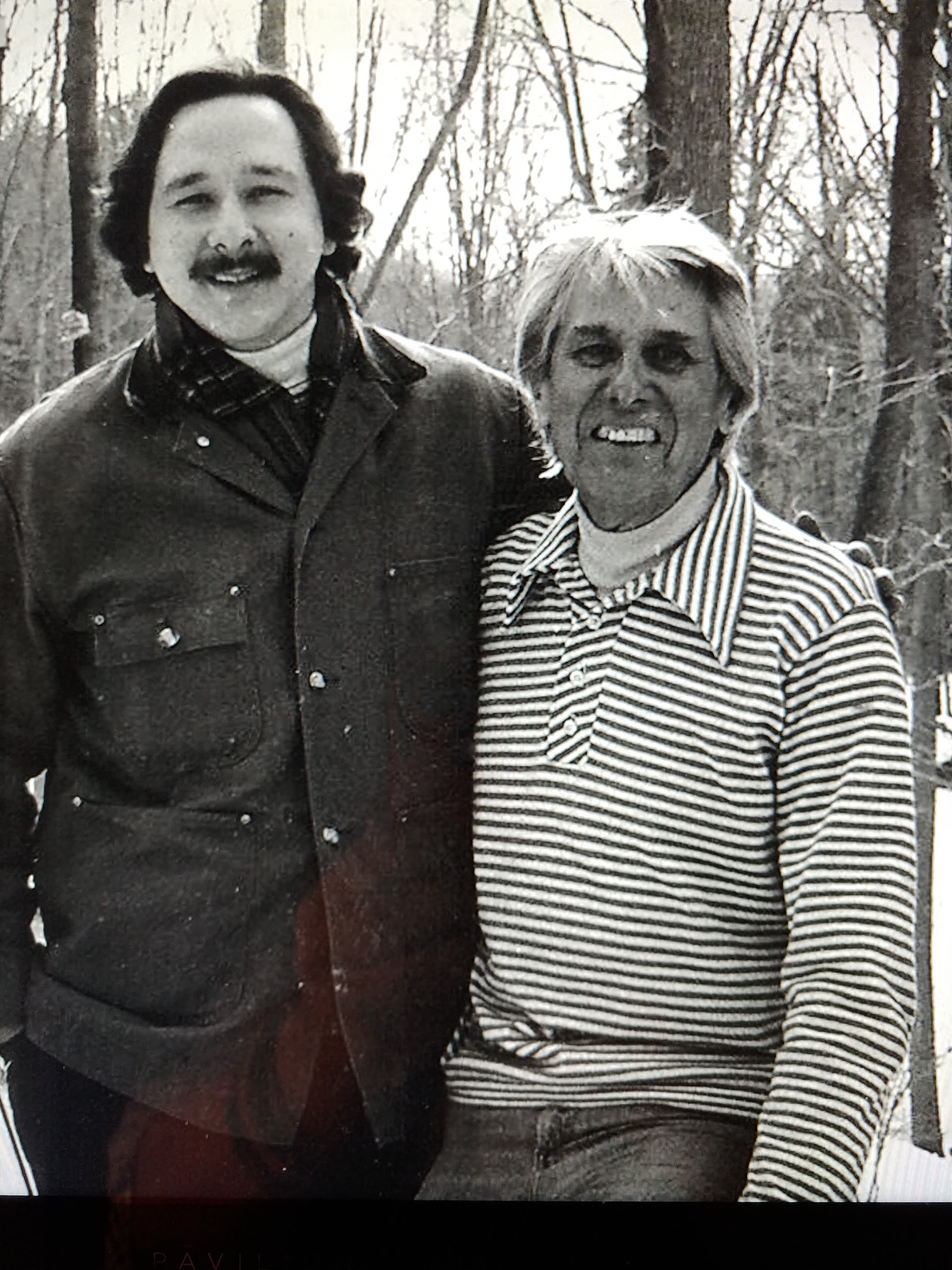
Eliasoph (age 25) with Paul Cadmus (age 72) at the artist's residence/studio, Weston, Connecticut, Dec. 1976.

Eliasoph is known for his role in the scholarly reevaluation of Paul Cadmus, an American artist who had been largely overlooked by major art institutions during the mid-20th century. Eliasoph initiated contact with Cadmus in 1974 through a letter that is now part of the Paul Cadmus Archive at Beinecke Library at Yale. Their interviews and correspondence formed the basis for Eliasoph’s dissertation, which has been credited with reestablishing Cadmus’s significance in American art. At the time of Eliasoph’s initial study, Cadmus’s works were absent from Being displayed – even suppressed in the collections of major museums such as the Metropolitan Museum of Art, the Art Institute of Chicago, and the Museum of Modern Art. Since then, Cadmus’s paintings have been acquired and exhibited by these and other institutions, a shift many scholars attribute in part to Eliasoph’s efforts to place Cadmus within the broader context of American and Renaissance-inspired social satire.

Eliasoph's approach emphasized Cadmus’s artistic technique, thematic influences, and satirical commentary, rather than primarily focusing on the artist’s sexuality. His work contributed to a broader understanding of Cadmus’s role in American art history, particularly in relation to social realism and the revival of figurative painting.

Eliasoph's work has been instrumental in restoring scholarly and curatorial attention to previously marginalized artists. His advocacy for Paul Cadmus is considered by art historians and curators to have played a formative role in the artist's reintegration into the mainstream canon of American art. His archival research and interviews with Cadmus continue to be cited in contemporary studies of American realism, LGBTQ+ art history, and visual satire.

Eliasoph is noted for his doctoral dissertation, Paul Cadmus: Life & Work (SUNY Binghamton, 1979), which is considered one of the first academic studies to re-evaluate Cadmus’s legacy within American art history. At a time when Cadmus’s work was largely absent from major museum collections, Eliasoph’s scholarship played a significant role in restoring Cadmus to prominence.

== Personal life ==
Eliasoph has been married to Yael Gertner since June 4, 1972. They have three children and five grandchildren. He resides in Fairfield, Connecticut.

== Published work ==
As an art historian, Eliasoph has focused on WPA-era urban and social realists as well as artists in the Magical Realism school, including: Paul Cadmus, Robert Vickrey, Stevan Dohanos, Colleen Browning, Robert Bizinsky, Henry Koerner and Adolf Dehn. He is the author of over 250 art reviews in regional media, and of numerous books, including:

- Paul Cadmus: Yesterday & Today, Miami University Art Museum, Oxford, Ohio, 1981, ISBN 9780940784000
- Eliasoph, Philip (1993). Mark Balma: Drawing from Tradition – A Catalogue of Frescoes, Paintings and Drawings. Milan: Electa Publishers. ISBN 9788843546824.
- Robert Vickery: The Magic of Realism, Hudson Hills Press, New York, 2009, ISBN 9781555952921
- Colleen Browning: The Enchantment of Realism, Hudson Hills Press, NY, 2011, ISBN 9781555953669
- Robert C. Jackson Paintings, Schiffer Publishers, 2012, ISBN 9780764340680
- Adolf Dehn: Midcentury Manhattan, Artist Book Foundation, North Adams, Mass; October, 2017, ISBN 9780996200714
- Eliasoph, Philip (2023). Arthur Szyk: Art – Propaganda – Memory, Fairfield University Art Museum. Fairfield, CT. ISBN 9798218272517.
