= John E. Thiel =

American Catholic theologian

John Edwin Thiel
- Born: July 28, 1951 (age 75); United States
- Education: Fairfield University (BA); McMaster University (MA, PhD)
- Occupations: Theologian, professor
- Years active: 1973–2022
- Employer: Fairfield University
- Known for: Catholic systematic theology
- Notable work: Senses of Tradition (2000); God, Evil, and Innocent Suffering (2002); Now and Forever (2023)
- Title: Aloysius P. Kelley, S.J. Professor of Catholic Studies, Emeritus
- Awards: Alpha Sigma Nu Book Award (2014); Catholic Press Writers Association Award (2014)

John Edwin Thiel (born July 28, 1951) is the Aloysius P. Kelley, S.J. Professor of Catholic Studies, Emeritus, Fairfield University, Fairfield, Connecticut, U.S.A, where he taught for 49 years.

== Biography ==
He received his B.A. from Fairfield University and his M.A. and Ph.D. from McMaster University. He was Visiting Professor of Religious Studies, Yale University, in the spring semesters of 2000, 2019, and 2020. Twice a recipient of fellowships from the National Endowment for the Humanities, he is the author of seven books. He writes in the field of Roman Catholic systematic theology. He served as president of the Catholic Theological Society of America in 2011-12, and as president of the American Theological Society in 2023-24

== Books ==
- God and World in Schleiermacher’s “Dialektik” and “Glaubenslehre” (Lang,1981)
- Imagination and Authority: Theological Authorship in the Modern Tradition (Fortress, 1991)
- Nonfoundationalism (Guides to Theological Inquiry) (Fortress, 1995)
- Senses of Tradition: Continuity and Development in Catholic Faith (Oxford, 2000)
- God, Evil, and Innocent Suffering: A Theological Reflection (Crossroad, 2002)
- Icons of Hope: The “Last Things” in Catholic Imagination (Notre Dame, 2013)
- Now and Forever: A Theological Aesthetics of Time (Notre Dame, 2023)

== Awards ==
2014 Alpha Sigma Nu Book Award, Theology Category

2014 Catholic Press Writers Association Book Award, Theology Category
