= Pauline Rubin =

Pauline Rubin may refer to:

- Paula Eliasoph (née Pauline Rubin, 1895–1983), an American painter
- Pauline Rubin (footballer) (née Pauline Hammarlund, born 1994), a Swedish footballer
