= William McInnes (disambiguation) =

William McInnes (born 1964) is an Australian actor.

William McInnes may also refer to:

- William Wallace Burns McInnes (1871–1954), Canadian politician
- William Beckwith McInnes (1889–1939), Australian artist
- William C. McInnes (1923–2009), American university president, 1964–1973

== See also ==
- William Joseph McInnes Botanic Garden and Campus Arboretum, Mills College, California, USA
