= Paul Lakeland =

American academic

Paul Lakeland (born April 22, 1946, in Preston, England) is an American academic and former Jesuit priest.

== Biography ==
Lakeland received his MA from Oxford University; BD from the University of London; and PhD from Vanderbilt University.

Lakeland, a former Jesuit priest, is married and has one son, Jonathan Palmer Lakeland who is a professional pianist and conductor, and also a graduate of Westminster Choir College. Paul Lakeland has also been a member of the group Voice of the Faithful.

Lakeland served as the inaugural Rev. Aloysius P. Kelley, S.J., Professor of Catholic Studies and Chair of the Center for Catholic Studies at Fairfield University in Fairfield, Connecticut, from 2004 through 2023. Lakeland was named the 2005 Fairfield University Teacher of the Year. Lakeland was awarded the first place 2004 Catholic Press Award, in the category of theology, for his book, The Liberation of the Laity: In Search of an Accountable Church (Continuum International, New York, N.Y., 2003). Lakeland served as the Director of the Center for Catholic Studies at Fairfield and host of the Voices of Others video series in which he sits down with distinguished scholars, theologians and social activists to discuss issues surrounding the theme “Listening to the Voices of Others.” Past special guests include Loung Ung, Greg Boyle, Paul Farmer, and Archbishop Demetrios of America.

Lakeland is a contributing blogger to The Huffington Post and a contributing writer to Commonweal.

Lakeland has come out in support of controversial theologian Roger Haight in the magazine Commonweal. In January 2007, he published an impassioned apologia of his thought by the title "Not So Heterodox. In Defense of Roger Haight."

== Views ==
Lakeland believes that clerical celibacy should become optional and that change is inevitable. He further believes the Roman Catholic priests are not sufficiently accountable to outsiders. Lakeland claims those church leaders who allowed child sex abuse to continue were less responsive over the duty to act accountably than lay Catholics who have routinely had to act accountably towards employers and family. During the first few centuries of the Christian Era the laity routinely played a part in the choice of clergy up to and including the pope. Pope Leo the Great is quoted pronouncing, "Let the one who is going to rule over all be elected by all". He believes the church has traditionally been sensitive to political models that were contemporary at the time and believes it would be good if the church were today more democratic. Lakeland feels the church should seek to imitate the Holy Trinity where he feels the three persons are coequal and not hierarchal.

In his view, the church is in crisis and losing credibility due to, "the wholly human predilection for rules, regulations, buildings, status, power over others, secrecy, silence, ambition and expediency." Demands for unthinking obedience to a hierarchical authority reduce the church to something purely human. Lakeland believes good order in the church is God given but pyramidal power structure that existed since medieval times is not conducive to good order. The church has lost credibility because it has lost accountability. He considers that Catholic bishops are out of step with lay Catholics over acceptance of sexual diversity and same sex relationships. Lay Catholics are accepting while the church hierarchy demands lifelong celibacy from people with non heterosexual orientation. Lakeland feels both sides should examine what the other side says but also suspects the church hierarchy are wrong when they seek to deny people with same sex orientation the chance of love.

== Books ==
- The Wounded "Angel: Fiction and the Religious Imagination (Liturgical, 2017)
- A Council That Will Never End (Liturgical, 2013)
- Church: Living Communion (Liturgical, 2009)
- Catholicism at the Crossroads: How the Laity Can Save the Church (Continuum, March 2007)
- The Liberation of the Laity: In Search of an Accountable Church (2004)
- Postmodernity: Christian Identity in a Fragmented Age (1997)
- Theology and Critical Theory: The Discourse of the Church (1990)
- Free in Christ: The Challenge of Political Theology (1984)
- The Politics of Salvation: The Hegelian Idea of the State (1984)
- Can Women Be Priests? (1975).
