= Chaminade University of Honolulu =

Marianist university in Hawaii, U.S.

- Former names: St. Louis Junior College (1955–57); Chaminade College (1957–77)
- Motto: Vita In Verbo (Latin)
- Motto in English: Life in [the] Word
- Type: Private university
- Established: 1955; 71 years ago
- Accreditation: WSCUC
- Affiliations: Roman Catholic (Marianist)
- Academic affiliations: ACCU; NAICU
- Endowment: $49.85 million (2025)
- President: Lynn Babington
- Students: 2,369
- Undergraduates: 1,583
- Postgraduates: 786
- Location: Honolulu, Hawaii, United States; 21°17.381′N 157°48.412′W
- Colors: Blue, white, silver
- Nickname: Silverswords
- Sporting affiliations: NCAA Division II – PacWest
- Website: chaminade.edu
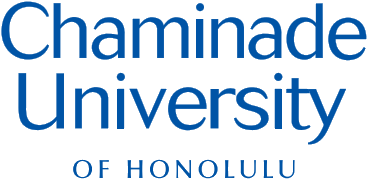

Chaminade University of Honolulu is a private Marianist university in Honolulu, Hawaii, United States. Founded in 1955 by the Society of Mary, Chaminade is in Kaimuki, Honolulu, at the base of St. Louis Heights. Chaminade University offers bachelor's degrees in 40 fields and 19 master's degree programs, amd 5 doctoral programs. It is accredited by the WASC Senior College and University Commission.

== History ==
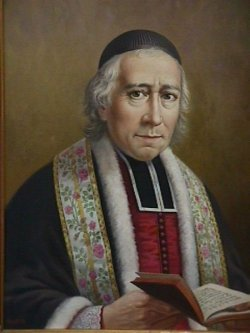
Chaminade University of Honolulu is named after the founder of the Society of Mary, Father William Joseph Chaminade.

Chaminade University of Honolulu was named after Father William Joseph Chaminade, a French Catholic priest who survived persecution during the French Revolution. He founded the Society of Mary in 1817. In 1849, Marianists sent missionaries to the United States to serve immigrant populations.

In September 1883, eight Marianist priests arrived in Honolulu and established Saint Louis School, today a middle and high school for boys. With the encouragement of Saint Louis alumni, the Marianists established a university to serve the educational needs of local Catholics.

They opened Saint Louis Junior College in 1955. Upon becoming a four-year institution, the school changed its name to Chaminade College in 1957. When graduate programs were added in 1977, Chaminade College changed its name to Chaminade University of Honolulu.

=== Marianist traditions ===
The Society of Mary (Marianists) is a religious order of brothers and priests following the vision of Father William Joseph Chaminade, the founder of the Society of Mary. Since Chaminade believed schools were instrumental in changing society, Marianist schools focus on the education of the whole person, including both faith and reason, and preparing students for entry into their chosen careers. Chaminade's approach to education is founded in the Marianist education values:

- Educate for formation in faith
- Provide an excellent education
- Educate in family spirit
- Educate for service, justice and peace
- Educate for adaptation to change

== Campus ==
Chaminade's main campus, serving the undergraduate program and graduate program, is at the base of St. Louis Heights, a residential division of the Kaimuki district. Chaminade is about two miles outside Waikiki and four miles from Downtown Honolulu.

After receiving a grant in 2003, the campus underwent renovation and construction. This included construction of the Sullivan Family Library and the Dr. Lawrence K.W. and Mrs. BoHing Chan Tseu Center for Nursing Education.

== Academics ==
Chaminade has four colleges: College of Education and Human Development; College of Business, Innovation and Technology; College of Arts and Sciences; College of Nursing and Health Professions. Across the schools, there are 40 day undergraduate majors, 36 minors, 14 certificates, 6 associate degrees, 19 online degrees, 19 master degrees, and 5 doctoral degrees. Chaminade is the base for the first United Nations Institute for Training and Research in the Pacific Islands.

== Athletics ==
Chaminade University of Honolulu competes in the National Collegiate Athletic Association (NCAA) Division II as a member of the Pacific West Conference, a nine-member athletic conference with members located in California, Hawaii, and Utah. Chaminade University fields teams in baseball, basketball, cross country, golf for men, softball, tennis, and volleyball for women. In the fall of 2006, men's and women's soccer were added, as well as women's basketball. Chaminade University of Honolulu's team name is the "Silverswords," a reference to a Hawaiian plant prized for its beauty and ability to withstand harsh conditions.

One of the most notable victories in Chaminade University’s athletic history occurred in basketball. The university’s basketball team, the Silverswords, defeated the top-ranked Virginia Cavaliers 77–72 in 1982. This historic upset is widely regarded as one of the greatest in college basketball.

Chaminade also hosts the annual Maui Invitational basketball tournament, which began in 1984, partly as a result of the Silverswords' historic 1982 victory over Virginia.

== Student life ==
=== Diversity ===
In 2010, Chaminade's student body was 66% Asian/Pacific Islander, 18% White, 6% Hispanic, 4% Black, 2% non-resident alien, and 0.7% American Indian/Alaska Native.

=== Clubs and organizations ===
Chaminade students have the opportunity to participate in a variety of clubs and organizations, with over 30 clubs represented on campus. Clubs include student government, clubs for specific majors, and a variety of cultural clubs. Each year, members of the Samoan, Hawaiian, Micronesian, Tahitian, and Marianas clubs participate in the Pacific Island Review, an event showcasing the traditional ethnic dances of the Pacific Islands.

=== Residence halls ===
Chaminade offers on and off campus housing facilities for approximately 400 students. On-campus dorms include Hale Lokelani, Hale Pohaku and Keiffer Hall. Keiffer Hall is the only single sex dorm, offering housing for first-year and upper-year women. Hale Lokelani and Hale Pohaku are co-ed, suite style dorms available to first-year students (freshman status). The newest residence hall is the Marianist Living Learning Community with air-conditioned double rooms, common kitchen and recreation rooms. The off-campus facilities are: Waialae Avenue and Date Street.

== See also ==
- Yukio Ozaki (artist), former faculty
