= Leslie C. Quick Jr. =

Businessman from the United States of America

Leslie C. Quick Jr. (January 27, 1926 – March 8, 2001) was co-founder of Quick & Reilly. He graduated from Widener University. In 1974 he co-founded Quick & Reilly, the first New York Stock Exchange member firm to offer discounted commissions to individuals. It is one of the nation's leading brokerage firms, expanding the business to include one of the largest specialist firms on the New York Stock Exchange, a major clearing and execution firm, and a NASDAQ market maker.

== Family ==
Quick's family are devout Catholics. His widow, the late Regina Clarkson Quick (March 2, 1927 – April 3, 2006), was a Dame of Malta, and a noted philanthropist. They had seven children and 24 grandchildren.

== Affiliations ==
Quick was a member of the Fairfield University board of trustees, and chairman of the board from 1982 through 1995. He received an honorary doctorate from the university in 1999. The Regina A. Quick Center for the Arts on the campus of Fairfield University was built in 1990 with his support and named for his wife, Regina.

== Legacy ==
The Leslie C. Quick, Jr. Recreation Complex at Fairfield University was named in his honor in 2001, the year of his death. He contributed significantly to his alma mater, Widener University, whose football stadium, the Leslie C. Quick Jr. Stadium, was named after him when it was built in 1994. He is also honored with the name of Widener's business administration building, the Leslie C. Quick Jr. Building.

== Death ==
Leslie Quick died on March 8, 2001, in Boston, Massachusetts, aged 75, from undisclosed causes.
