= Jeffrey P. von Arx =

American historian

Jeffrey P. von Arx SJ

8th President of Fairfield University
- In office July 1, 2004 – December 23, 2016
- Preceded by: Aloysius P. Kelley, S.J.
- Succeeded by: Mark R. Nemec

Personal details
- Born: May 15, 1947 (age 79) Bellefonte, Pennsylvania, U.S.
- Education: Princeton University (BA); Yale University (MA, MPhil, PhD); Weston School of Theology (MDiv)
- Profession: Educator

Jeffrey Paul von Arx, S.J., is an American Jesuit and educator.

== Biography ==
Jeffrey von Arx was born in Bellefonte, Pennsylvania, and raised in Locust Valley, New York. He graduated from the Locust Valley Schools in 1965 and Princeton University in 1969 and entered the Society of Jesus that summer. He subsequently earned an M.A. and M.Phil. in history at Yale University, and completed his Ph.D. there in 1980. A year later, Fr. von Arx received an M.Div. from the Weston Jesuit School of Theology and was ordained a priest.

Arx served as the eighth president of Fairfield University from July 1, 2004, to December 31, 2016; previously, von Arx had served as Chair of the History Department at Georgetown University and as Dean of Fordham College at Rose Hill. In 2017, von Arx was appointed superior of John LaFarge House, the Jesuit house of studies in Cambridge, Massachusetts. He was the Thomas I. Gasson, S.J., Professor at Boston College for the academic year 2018–2019, and is currently (as of October 2025) Visiting Professor of the History of Christianity at the Boston College School of Theology and Ministry.

A noted scholar and historian, von Arx is an expert in the field of 19th-century British history. He is the author of several articles and books, including Progress and Pessimism: Religion, Politics and History in Late Nineteenth Century Britain (Harvard University Press, 1985) and Varieties of Ultramontanism (Catholic University Press, 1998). He is a Fellow of the Royal Historical Society.

Academic offices
Preceded by Aloysius P. Kelley, S.J.	President of Fairfield University; 2004–2016	Succeeded by Mark R. Nemec
