= Mark R. Nemec =

American educator

9th President of Fairfield University
- Incumbent
- Assumed office July 1, 2017
- Preceded by: Jeffrey P. von Arx

Personal details
- Born: Chicago, Illinois, U.S.
- Education: Yale University (BA); University of Michigan (MEd, PhD)
- Occupation: Professor; Administrator
- Website: Official Website

Mark R. Nemec (born in Chicago, Illinois) is an American educator. He is the ninth person and first layperson to serve as the president of the Fairfield University. Nemec was previously the Dean of the Graham School of Continuing Liberal and Professional Studies at the University of Chicago.

== Education ==
Nemec graduated from Loyola High School of Los Angeles in 1987. He received his bachelor's degree in English, cum laude, from Yale University in 1991, where he was a member of the Yale Rugby team and an All-Ivy League rugby player. Nemec then earned a master's degree in education with a concentration on higher education and public policy and a doctorate degree in political science from the University of Michigan in 2000, where he was awarded a Regents Fellowship and a Rackham Dissertation Fellowship.

== Career ==
Nemec served as the Dean of the Graham School of Continuing Liberal and Professional Studies from 2014 to 2017.

Prior to entering academia, Nemec served as the president and CEO of Eduventures, an information services firm providing research and advice to the higher education community, from 2011 to 2014. From 2005 to 2011, he served as managing director of the Technology Industry Client Group at Forrester Research, where he headed the Forrester Leadership Boards program and managed executive and peer-to-peer learning programs in the Americas. From 2000 to 2005, Nemec served as senior director at the Advisory Board Company.

Nemec is a frequent speaker on the current and future state of higher education and has presented to a diverse array of audiences including the White House’s Forum on College Affordability, the British Council’s Going Global, the New England Board of Higher Education’s Summit on Cost in Higher Education, and university faculty forums.

Earlier in his career, Nemec taught American politics as a visiting assistant professor at Davidson College and served as a policy advisor on technology and development to the Chairman of the Los Angeles County Board of Supervisors.

== Bibliography ==
Nemec is the author of Ivory Towers and Nationalist Minds: Universities, Leadership, and the Development of the American State (University of Michigan Press, 2006), chronicling the role of higher education in American political development. He also contributed an essay to The Educational Legacy of Woodrow Wilson (University of Virginia Press, 2012) entitled The Underappreciated Legacy: Wilson, Princeton, and the Ideal of the American State.

Academic offices
Preceded by Jeffrey P. von Arx	Fairfield University President; 2017–present	Succeeded by incumbent
