= Kathleen Murphy (executive) =

American lawyer and business executive (born 1963)

- Born: January 27, 1963 (age 63); Meriden, Connecticut, U.S.
- Education: Fairfield University (BA); University of Connecticut (JD)
- Occupations: Lawyer, Business executive
- Employer: Fidelity Investments
- Board member of: BlackRock; Markle Foundation; National Football Foundation; Financial Industry Regulatory Authority (FINRA)

Kathleen Ann Murphy (born January 27, 1963) is an American lawyer and business executive. She is the President of Fidelity Personal Investing, a unit of Fidelity Investments. In this role Murphy has had responsibility for Fidelity's retail brokerage, mutual fund, IRA, insurance and managed accounts businesses. It was announced on January 21, 2021 that Kathy will be retiring from Fidelity Investmests.

Fortune profiled Murphy as a Women of Power in 2010 and one of the 50 Most Powerful Women from 2007 to 2013. U.S. Banker named Murphy one of the Top 25 Nonbank Women in Finance in 2010 and 2011, and one of the 25 Most Powerful Women in Banking in 2008. Irish America magazine named her to their Wall Street 50 and Business 100 lists in 2007, 2008, 2009, 2010 and 2011. Investment Advisor named Murphy to their top women in wealth list in 2010 and 2011 and she has also been named to the Power 100 Financial Services list. She is an occasional guest on CNBC.

== Professional career ==
Murphy began her career as a healthcare attorney at Aetna, at age 27. She held different positions in legal and government affairs during her 15 years at Aetna, including general counsel and chief administrative officer of the financial-services arm. When the division was sold to ING Group in 2000, Murphy became group president of ING Worksite and Institutional Financial Services. She later became chief executive officer of ING U.S. Wealth Management. Murphy now serves as the president of the Personal Investments division at Fidelity Investments.

Fortune listed Murphy as a "Woman of Power" in 2010, and one of the 50 Most Powerful Women in 2007; she remains on the list, as of 2018. In 2013, Murphy was featured on American Banker's 25 Most Powerful Women in Finance.

Murphy serves on the Board of Directors for the Markle Foundation and the National Football Foundation, where she is also vice chair. She is on the Board of Governors of the Financial Industry Regulatory Authority (FINRA), and joined the board of directors of BlackRock in April 2025.

== Education ==
Murphy graduated summa cum laude with a Bachelor of Arts degree in both Economics and Political Science from Fairfield University and holds a Juris Doctor degree with highest honors from the University of Connecticut School of Law.
