= Joseph Moylan =

Joseph Anthony Moylan (July 14, 1938, in Hartford, Connecticut – May 16, 2013, in Durham, North Carolina) was founder and president of Durham Nativity School in Durham, North Carolina. He was a former clinical professor of surgery at the Duke University School of Medicine and medical director of the International Patient Center at the Duke University Medical Center. Moylan played a seminal role in development modern day trauma centers. He also served at the U.S. Army Institute of Surgical Research or Army Burn Center at the Brooke Army Medical Center in San Antonio, Texas, during the Vietnam War.

After retiring in 2002, Moylan and his wife, Carole, founded the Durham Nativity School, a middle school that provides education and physical, spiritual, social, and moral development for students of low-income urban families. The mission of the school is to prepare students from low-income backgrounds for a life of higher education and giving back. The school is a member of the NativityMiguel Network of Schools.

Duke University awarded Moylan their Humanitarian Service Award in 2004 in recognition of his service work at the Durham Nativity School. And the Duke Medical Alumni Association awarded their Humanitarian Award to Moylan in 2010.

Moylan received his bachelor's degree from Fairfield University in 1960 and medical degree from the Boston University School of Medicine. He completed his surgical residency in trauma care at the University of Washington Medical Center in 1969.
