= Lynn Babington =

American academic

Lynn M. Babington is an American nurse and educator. Babington has served as the president of Chaminade University of Honolulu since 2018. Formerly, she was provost and senior vice president for academic affairs at Fairfield University and served as Fairfield University interim president from 2016-2017.

== Education and career ==
Babington earned a Bachelor of Science in Nursing from the University of Michigan before working as a nurse. Babington went on to earn a master's degree and PhD in nursing from the University of Washington. She would go on to become the Associate Director of Nursing at San Francisco General Hospital before entering academia as an associate professor and then assistant and associate Dean, and director of the doctorate of nursing at Northeastern University.

Babington served as provost and senior vice president for academic affairs at Fairfield University before becoming interim president from 2016-2017. She has been president of Chaminade University of Honolulu since 2018.

== Publications ==
- Babington, Lynn M.; Malone, Linda; Kelley, Barbara R. (May 2015). "Perceived social support, self esteem, and pregnancy status among Dominican adolescents". Applied Nursing Research. 28 (2): 121–126. doi:10.1016/j.apnr.2014.08.001.
- Babington, Lynn M.; Kelley, Barbara R.; Patsdaughter, Carol A. (January 2009). "Self-esteem and Risk Behaviors of Dominican Adolescents". Issues in Comprehensive Pediatric Nursing. 32 (3): 131–144. doi:10.1080/01460860903062774.
- Babington, Lynn; Patel, Bavika (November 2008). "Understanding Child Feeding Practices of Vietnamese Mothers". MCN: The American Journal of Maternal/Child Nursing. 33 (6): 376–381. doi:10.1097/01.NMC.0000341259.03298.26.
- Babington, Lynn M.; Kelley, Barbara R.; Patsdaughter, Carol A. (November 2007). "Risk Behaviors of Dominican Adolescents in Their Homeland and in the United States". Journal of Pediatric Health Care. 21 (6): 372–380. doi:10.1016/j.pedhc.2007.03.005.
