= James Lewis Abbruzzese =

American gastrointestinal oncologist

- Education: Fairfield University, B.A. University of Chicago Pritzker School of Medicine, M.D.
- Awards: National Thought Leader on Pancreatic Cancer
- Scientific career
- Fields: Pancreatic cancer
- Workplaces: Duke Cancer Institute; University of Texas MD Anderson Cancer Center (Prior)

James Lewis Abbruzzese is the Chief of the Duke Division of Medical Oncology and associate director for Clinical Research for the Duke Cancer Institute. Previously, Abbruzzese was Chairman of the Department of Gastrointestinal Medical Oncology at the University of Texas M. D. Anderson Cancer Center where he held the M. G. and Lillie A. Johnson Chair for Cancer Treatment and Research and the Annie Laurie Howard Research Distinguished Professorship. Abbruzzese is one of the world's leaders in the clinical study and treatment of pancreatic cancer.

== Education ==
Abbruzzese received his bachelor's degree in biology from Fairfield University in 1974; medical degree with honors from the University of Chicago - Pritzker School of Medicine in 1978; and completed his residency in Internal Medicine at Johns Hopkins Hospital from 1979 to 1981.

Abbruzzese also completed clinical fellowships in Infectious Diseases at the Johns Hopkins Hospital in 1981, Medical Oncology at the Dana–Farber Cancer Institute of Harvard Medical School in 1982; and Medical Oncology Research Laboratory of Neoplastic Disease Mechanisms at the Dana–Farber Cancer Institute in 1983.

== Research ==
Abbruzzese research is focused on the development of novel therapeutic agents for pancreatic and other gastrointestinal cancers. He is principal investigator of a phase I drug development grant from the National Cancer Institute and another grant to develop techniques to assess the impact of novel targeted therapeutic agents in cancer patients.

In October 2008, Abbruzzese published in the Journal of Clinical Oncology the first-of-its-kind findings of a study showing the discovery that exposure to the hepatitis B virus (HBV) may increase the risk of pancreatic cancer.

Abbruzzese is the author of over 150 articles and book chapters and is Editor-in-Chief of the International Journal of Pancreatology. He serves on the editorial board of a number of prestigious journals, including the Journal of Clinical Oncology and Clinical Cancer Research, and also serves on the Scientific Advisory Board of the Lustgarten Foundation for Pancreatic Cancer Research.

== Honors ==
In 2005, Abbruzzese was named a National Thought Leader in the area of pancreatic cancer following a national survey of hematologist/oncologists and medical oncologists by BioMedical Insights, Inc. Abbruzzese is a Fellow of the Royal Society of Medicine and a Fellow of the American College of Physicians.

In 2008, he received a Statesman Award from the American Society of Clinical Oncology.
