= Royden B. Davis =

Royden B. Davis SJ

Personal details
- Born: October 19, 1923 Ventnor City, New Jersey, U.S.
- Died: April 2, 2002 (aged 78)
- Resting place: Jesuit Community Cemetery; Washington, D.C., U.S.
- Education: Georgetown University (BS); Saint Louis University; Woodstock College
- Military career
- Allegiance: United States
- Branch: United States Army
- Service years: 1943–1945
- Conflicts: World War II

Royden B. Davis, SJ (October 19, 1923 – April 2, 2002) served as Dean of Georgetown College at Georgetown University from 1966 to 1989.

== Early life and education ==
Royden B. Davis was born in Ventnor City, New Jersey, Davis served in the United States Army from 1943 to 1945 as a gunner in an anti-aircraft battery. He earned a Bachelor of Science degree in economics in 1947 and a law degree in 1949 from Georgetown University. At Georgetown he was good friends with undergraduate student William Peter Blatty, and together they launched the satiric "Flask and Bottle Society" for skits, a play on the name of Georgetown's theatre troupe, the Mask and Bauble Dramatic Society.

In 1950, he entered the Society of Jesus at the Novitiate of Saint Isaac Jogues in Wernersville, Pennsylvania. In 1955, he earned a master's degree in political science and a licentiate in philosophy from Saint Louis University. He received a licentiate in theology from Woodstock College in 1960. Following a year of study in Belgium, he returned to Georgetown University for additional graduate studies in government from 1961 to 1965.

Ordained to the priesthood on June 21, 1959, by Archbishop Francis Patrick Keough, he pronounced his final vows in the Society of Jesus on February 2, 1967.

== Career ==
Davis began his career at Georgetown University in 1965 when he was named dean of freshmen and assistant dean of the College of Arts and Sciences. In 1966, he was appointed dean of the College of Arts and Sciences, a post that he would hold until 1989.

In 1969, Davis welcomed the admission of the first women students to Georgetown's College of Arts and Sciences. He oversaw the inauguration of the American Studies Program, the expansion of the Fine Arts Department, the establishment and growth of the Psychology Department, and the creation of the Sociology and Computer Science departments.

After retirement in 1989, he directed Georgetown's Foreign Studies Program in Florence, Italy and, in 1990, served as chair of a committee commemorating the 500th anniversary of the birth of Ignatius of Loyola.

In 1991, Davis returned to the University of Scranton, where he had taught briefly in the 1950s, to serve as rector of the Jesuit Community at Scranton. In this role, he was a member of the Board of Trustees of The University of Scranton and Scranton Preparatory School. At the conclusion of his service as rector in 1997, he remained at the University of Scranton as an associate campus minister and chaplain of the Panuska College of Professional Studies.

== Death ==
Davis died on April 2, 2002, and was buried on April 5 in the Jesuit Community Cemetery on the campus of Georgetown University.

== Awards and legacy ==
In 1985, he received an honorary Doctor of Humane Letters degree from Georgetown. In 1992, he had an endowed chair in interdisciplinary studies at Georgetown named in his honor. In 1997, the University of Scranton presented Davis with the Pedro Arrupe, S.J., Award for Ignatian Mission and Ministries, which recognizes persons who have made significant contributions to the Ignation mission. The Royden B. Davis, S.J., College Chair was established through gifts of friends, alumni, parents and students, to allow distinguished individuals in the humanities, arts, sciences or social sciences to spend a semester's residence at Georgetown University. Georgetown gives the Royden B. Davis fellowship, including the Davis Research Fellowships and Davis Experiential Learning Fellowships, in his honor. In 2005, the university dedicated the Royden B. Davis S.J. Performing Arts Center to his memory. There is a teaching garden with a historical marker in his memory on Georgetown's campus between Regents Hall and the McDonough School of Business. The University of Scranton named the Hill-Davis Jesuit Collection for him.

Academic offices
Preceded by Thomas R. Fitzgerald, S.J.	Dean of Georgetown College; 1966—1989	Succeeded by Robert B. Lawton, S.J.
