= Thomas R. Fitzgerald (Jesuit) =

American academic (1922–2004)

Thomas R. Fitzgerald S.J.

6th President of Fairfield University
- In office 1973–1979
- Preceded by: William C. McInnes
- Succeeded by: Aloysius P. Kelley

30th President of Saint Louis University
- In office 1979–1987
- Preceded by: Edward Drummond
- Succeeded by: Lawrence Biondi

Personal details
- Born: February 23, 1922 Washington, D.C., U.S.
- Died: March 22, 2004 (aged 82) Washington, D.C., U.S.
- Education: Georgetown University, University of Chicago

Thomas Rollins Fitzgerald, S.J. (February 23, 1922 – March 22, 2004) was an American Jesuit priest who served as the sixth president of Fairfield University from 1973 to 1979 and the 30th president of Saint Louis University from 1979 to 1987.

== Biography ==
Thomas Fitzgerald was born on February 23, 1922, in Washington, D.C., and attended Gonzaga College High School. He later studied at Georgetown University and entered the Society of Jesus in 1939. He was ordained a priest in 1952 in Leuven, Belgium, having received a licentiate degree in sacred theology there. He also received a doctorate in classical languages from the University of Chicago.

During his six-year tenure at Fairfield University, Father Fitzgerald oversaw the construction of the Student Recreational Complex and the Center for Financial Studies, which has since become the home of the Dolan School of Business. He also directed the creation of the Dolan School of Business in 1978, which had been the Department of Business Administration for 31 years within the Fairfield College of Arts and Sciences.

Fitzgerald suffered from heart problems in his later years and died in his hometown on March 22, 2004, at age 82.

Academic offices
Preceded by William C. McInnes, S.J.	President of Fairfield University; 1973–1979	Succeeded by Aloysius P. Kelley, S.J.
Preceded by Joseph A. Sellinger, S.J.	Dean of Georgetown College; 1964—1966	Succeeded by Royden B. Davis, S.J.
