= Jennifer Piepszak =

American financial executive

- Born: 1970 or 1971 (age 55–56)
- Education: Fairfield University (BS)
- Occupation: COO of JPMorgan Chase
- Spouse: Richard Piepszak
- Children: 3

Jennifer Piepszak (born 1970 or 1971) is an American financial executive and chief operating officer (COO) of JPMorgan Chase. Her appointment was announced on January 25, 2024. Prior to this, Piepszak served as co-chief executive officer (CEO) of Consumer and Community Banking at Chase.

== Early life ==
Piepszak graduated with a Bachelor of Science degree from Fairfield University.

== Career ==
Piepszak joined JPMorgan Chase in 1994. During her first 17 years she worked in the Corporate & Investment Bank, where she served as chief financial officer (CFO) for mortgage banking, CFO for the Investment Bank Credit Portfolio and Controller for Global Equities and Prime Services.

From 2015 to 2017 Piepszak was the CEO of Business Banking. From 2017 to 2019, Piepszak was the CEO of Chase Card Services, covering small business, consumer and commercial card businesses. In 2019, Piepszak was named CFO of JPMorgan Chase & Co., succeeding Marianne Lake. In 2021, Piepszak and Lake were both named heads of the consumer and community bank.

In 2023, she ranked 35th in Forbes list of "World's 100 most powerful women". American Banker recognized Piepszak as the No. 3 Most Powerful Woman in Banking in 2024.

In 2024, she was appointed Co-CEO of the Commercial & Investment Bank.

The Wall Street Journal speculated that Piepszak may be in line to succeed Jamie Dimon as CEO of JPMorgan Chase.

Piepszak is known to be focused on her and her reports "getting stuff done".

In January 2025, The Financial Times reported that Piepszak would replace Daniel Pinto as chief operating officer of JPMorgan Chase at the end of June 2025, but Piepszak later withdrew herself from consideration.

== Recognition ==
- American Banker No. 4 Woman to Watch in 2018.
- Crain's New York No. 2 Most Powerful Women in New York in 2019.
- Barron's one of the 100 Most Influential Women in U.S. Finance in 2020.
- 24th on Fortune's list of Most Powerful Women in 2023.

== Personal life ==
Piepszak is married and has three sons.
