= William C. McInnes =

William C. McInnes, S.J.

5th President of Fairfield University
- In office 1964–1973
- Preceded by: James E. FitzGerald, S.J.
- Succeeded by: Thomas R. Fitzgerald, S.J.

President of the University of San Francisco
- In office 1972–1977
- Preceded by: Albert R. Jonsen, S.J.
- Succeeded by: John Lo Schiavo, S.J.

Personal details
- Born: January 20, 1923 Dorchester, Massachusetts
- Died: December 8, 2009 (aged 86) Weston, Massachusetts
- Education: Boston College; MIT; Saint John's Seminary; Weston College; New York University
- Profession: Jesuit, academic

William Charles McInnes Jr., S.J. (January 20, 1923 – December 8, 2009) was an American Jesuit and academic.

McInnes served as the fifth President of Fairfield University, located in Fairfield, Connecticut, from 1964 to 1973, and the President of the University of San Francisco from 1972 to 1977. He served as the president of both universities simultaneously for a few months in 1972. He later headed the Association of Jesuit Colleges and Universities, a consortium of Jesuit colleges and universities in the United States, from 1977 until 1989. McInnes was one of the first Jesuit priests to study business administration.

== Biography ==
=== Early life ===
McInnes was born on January 20, 1923, in Dorchester, Massachusetts, to parents, William and Mary (Byrne) McInnes. He was one of three children, including his sister, Helen and brother, Paul. McInnes lived in Boston during his early childhood before the family purchased a home in Quincy, Massachusetts. He attended local public schools.

McInness enrolled in Boston College in 1940. However, he enlisted in the United States Army in 1942 after noticing an ad on a Boston College bulletin board promising to train students as meteorologists. The United States Army trained McInnes as a meteorologist at the Massachusetts Institute of Technology. He travelled with the Army Air Forces as a meteorology officer during World War II, serving in China, Africa and India. He was stationed in Assam for six months and later worked in Shanghai.

McInnes graduated from Boston College in 1944 and was honorably discharged from the United States Army in 1946. He initially enrolled in Saint John's Seminary in Massachusetts following World War II, intending to become a diocesan Roman Catholic priest. However, Father John Drummey, a professor at Boston College, recommended that he join the Jesuit order instead.

He entered the Society of Jesus in 1946 and studied philosophy at Weston College. McInnes earned his master's degree in business from Boston College. He then obtained a doctorate in business administration from New York University.

McInnes was ordained a Jesuit priest in 1957. In doing so, McInnes became one of the first Jesuits to specialize in business administration.

=== Boston College ===
McInness joined the faculty of Boston College in 1959. In 1964, he was promoted to assistant dean of Boston College's school of business.

=== Fairfield University ===
McInness was appointed as the President of Fairfield University in Connecticut by the Jesuits in 1964, a position he would hold until 1973. He had no prior knowledge that he would was to be given the post at Fairfield and was summoned to a "secret meeting" where he was appointed president.

He oversaw the rapid expansion of the university's campus and student population during his presidency. Under Mcinness, the overall student enrollment at Fairfield doubled to nearly 2,500 students at the time. Fairfield, which had previously been an all-male institution, began accepting women in 1970, becoming a co-ed institution for the first time. The school's first female alumni graduated in 1973. The Graduate School of Corporate and Political Communication, School of Nursing and Center for Lifetime Learning were all established during McInness' tenure as college president.

McInness also oversaw several major challenges to Fairfield University during the 1960s and 1970s. McInness offered testimony before the United States Supreme Court in the Tilton vs. Richardson case. The Tilton vs. Richardson lawsuit, which was filed against Fairfield University and three other Roman Catholic colleges, ultimately upheld the constitutionality of using American federal money for the construction of secular academic buildings at colleges and universities with religious affiliations. The Supreme Court ruled in favor of Fairfield in 1971.

In 1969, a group of African American students seized an academic building located on Fairfield's campus. McInness negotiated directly with the students involved, eventually agreeing to some of their demands, including a commitment to hiring minority faculty members and increasing the number of black students from 43 to 240 at the time. Fairfield University also experienced a ten-day student strike during the late 1960s.

McInnes was criticized outside Fairfield University because no university students were ever punished for building takeovers or strikes. He noted that no university property or buildings were damaged or destroyed during the 1960s campus unrest, "We never had any physical damages on the Fairfield campus, and we did not have any fatalities or serious injuries. But we lost several outside friends, because they did not appreciate the way we were handling the crisis."

McInnes was appointed president of the University of San Francisco in 1972. However, he remained the president of both Fairfield and San Francisco simultaneously for four months during the Fall 1972 semester while transititioning between the two colleges.

McInnes officially stepped down as president of Fairfield University in 1973 and was succeeded by Thomas R. Fitzgerald, S.J.

=== University of San Francisco ===
Father McInnes was appointed president of the University of San Francisco in 1972. He simultaneously served as president of both San Francisco and Fairfield University for four months during the transition between the two universities.

The University of San Francisco was in a deep financial crisis at the time of McInnes' arrival in 1972. McInnes instituted a series of financial reforms which resulted in a corrected, balanced budget for the university.

McInnes initiated negotiations which led to the acquisition of the now defunct San Francisco College for Women campus on Lone Mountain. Today, the Lone Mountain campus houses administrative offices, classrooms and the offices of the university's president and vice president.

McInnes also founded the Fromm Institute for Lifelong Learning, a program for retirees, during his tenure as president.

=== Association of Jesuit Colleges and Universities ===
He departed the University of San Francisco in 1977 to become the head of the Association of Jesuit Colleges and Universities (AJCU), a consortium consisting of the twenty-eight Jesuit colleges and universities in the United States. He served as the head of the AJCU for twelve years. His position allowed him to meet both Pope Paul VI and Pope John Paul II. McInness stepped down as head of the AJCU in 1989.

=== Later life ===
He later became the campus minister at the University of Connecticut in 1990. That same year, McInnes also became the parochial vicar of St. Thomas Aquinas Roman Catholic Parish in Storrs, Connecticut.

In 1998, McInness rejoined Boston College as an adjunct professor at the Carroll School of Management. He also became the faculty advisor for BC's chapter of the Alpha Sigma Nu Jesuit honor society.

McInnes campaigned to build a Vietnam War memorial on the Boston College campus. The memorial, which measures 70 feet long and commemorates members of the Boston College community killed in Vietnam, was dedicated on November 11, 2009.

Father William McInnes died on December 8, 2009, from complications of cancer and a fall at the Campion Center Jesuit retreat facility in Weston, Massachusetts, at the age of 86. His funeral was held at St. Ignatius Church in Chestnut Hill, Massachusetts, and he was buried at the Campion Center Cemetery in Weston, Massachusetts.

Preceded by James E. FitzGerald, S.J.	President of Fairfield University; 1964–1972	Succeeded by Thomas R. Fitzgerald, S.J.
Preceded by Albert R. Jonsen, S.J.	President of the University of San Francisco; 1972–1977	Succeeded by John Lo Schiavo, S.J.
