= Absolute Return + Alpha =

US magazine covering hedge funds

AR: Absolute Return + Alpha
- Editor: Michael Peltz
- Categories: Business and management magazine
- Frequency: Web: Daily / Print: Monthly
- Circulation: 9,000
- Publisher: Euromoney Institutional Investor
- Founded: 2009
- Country: United States
- Based in: New York City
- Language: English
- Website: www.absolutereturn-alpha.com
- ISSN: 2151-1837

AR: Absolute Return + Alpha (or AR) is a hedge fund magazine founded in 2009. The magazine has its editorial offices in New York City.

== History and profile ==
Absolute Return + Alpha (AR) was launched in September 2009, as a subsidiary of financial publisher Euromoney Institutional Investor. AR was formed when two magazines, Alpha and Absolute Return, were combined. The magazine publishes both online and print content. Its main focus is the hedge fund industry and its 3,500 fund managers, but the magazine also covers significant financial events and global research. The magazine features hedge fund rankings according to assets under management rankings, an annual ranking of the 25 highest paid hedge fund managers, and monthly tables of U.S. hedge fund performance data.
