= Aloysius P. Kelley =

American educator

Aloysius P. Kelley S.J.

7th President of Fairfield University
- In office 1979–2004
- Preceded by: Thomas R. Fitzgerald
- Succeeded by: Jeffrey P. von Arx

Personal details
- Born: October 4, 1929 (age 96) Carlisle, Pennsylvania, U.S.
- Education: St. Joseph's Preparatory School
- Alma mater: St. Louis University; University of Innsbruck; University of Pennsylvania

Aloysius Paul Kelley, S.J. (born October 4, 1929) is an American Jesuit and educator. He served as the seventh president of Fairfield University, located in Fairfield, Connecticut, from 1979 to 2004.

== Biography ==
Kelley, from Carlisle, Pennsylvania, graduated from St. Joseph's Preparatory School in Philadelphia. He then earned degrees at St. Louis University (B.A. and M.A.), University of Innsbruck (Lic.), and University of Pennsylvania (Ph.D). He was ordained in 1962 in Innsbruck.

Kelley held positions teaching at St. Joseph's Preparatory School and the University of Pennsylvania, then held several positions at Georgetown University including vice president of academic affairs. He was named a trustee of the University of Scranton in 1974.

Kelley was inaugurated as president of Fairfield University in September 1979. During his 25-year tenure as president of Fairfield, Kelley increased the full-time faculty from 151 to 220, and increased the institution's endowment from under $2 million in 1979 to $131 million by 2003. The campus was transformed by the construction of 14 new buildings and the renovation of 12 others.

In 2004, Fairfield established the "Aloysius P. Kelley, S.J., Chair in Catholic Studies", a professorship to honor his service to the university. Holders of this position include Paul Lakeland, John E. Thiel, and John T. Slotemaker.

Preceded by Thomas R. Fitzgerald, S.J.	Fairfield University President; 1979–2004	Succeeded by Jeffrey P. von Arx, S.J.
