= Paula Eliasoph =

American painter and poet (1895–1983)

- Born: Pauline Rubin; October 26, 1895; New York City, U.S.
- Died: June 15, 1983 (aged 87); New York City, U.S.
- Burial place: Montefiore Cemetery
- Other name: Paula Rubin Eliasoph
- Education: Pratt Institute, Art Students League of New York, Columbia University
- Occupations: Painter, engraver, illustrator, watercolorist, poet
- Spouse: Joseph Elijah Eliasoph (m. 1920–1944; his death)
- Children: 3
- Relatives: Philip Eliasoph (grandson)

Paula Eliasoph (née Pauline Rubin; 1895 – 1983) was an American painter, printmaker, illustrator, and poet. She was most active in the 1920s and 1930s in New York City.

== Biography ==
Paula Eliasoph was born as Pauline Rubin on October 26, 1895, in New York City, and raised in Connecticut. She was Jewish.

Eliasoph attended Pratt Institute in Brooklyn; followed by studies at the Art Students League of New York, and Columbia University. During her time at Pratt Institute, her art studio was near Childe Hassam's studio, on West 57th Street.

In 1920, she married Joseph E. Eliasoph, who was a civil engineer born in the Russian Empire. Together they had three children.

In 1930 and 1931, Eliasoph had solo exhibitions of her watercolor work at Leonard Clayton Gallery in New York, City. She was a member of the American Watercolor Society, and the Art Students League of New York.

Her artwork can be found in museum collections, including at the Metropolitan Museum of Art, Binghamton University Art Museum, the Harvard Art Museums, the Brooklyn Museum, and the New York Public Library.

The Paula Eliasoph papers, 1917–1980 can be found at the Archives of American Art.
