= Regina A. Quick Center for the Arts =

Coordinates: 41.1584°N 73.2533°W

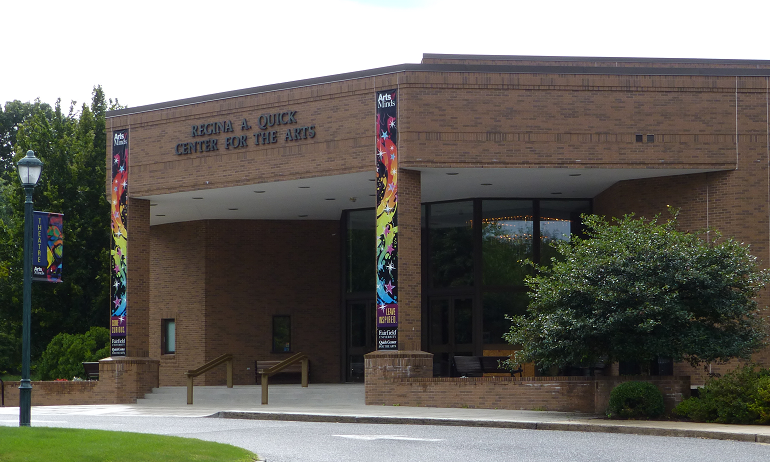
- Interactive map of Regina A. Quick Center for the Arts
- Address: Fairfield, Connecticut; USA
- Owner: Fairfield University
- Capacity: 740
- Type: Indoor theatre

Construction
- Opened: 1990

Website
- www.quickcenter.com

The Regina A. Quick Center for the Arts is the major center of theatre and the arts at Fairfield University located in Fairfield, Connecticut. The Center includes events such as popular and classical music, dance, theatre, and programs for young audiences. Westport Magazine recognized the Quick Center as the "cultural epicenter of Fairfield County."

The Quick Center was constructed and dedicated in 1990 with the generous support and leadership of Fairfield University benefactor, Leslie C. Quick Jr. and was named for his wife, Regina. Quick was a member of the Fairfield University Board of Trustees, Chairman of the Board from 1982 through 1995 and received an Honorary Doctorate from the university in 1999.

== Facilities ==
- Aloysius P. Kelley, S.J. Theatre (capacity: 740 seats)
- Lawrence A. Wien Experimental Theatre (a "black box theater", capacity: 150 seats)
- Thomas J. Walsh Jr. Art Gallery

== Gerard Manley Hopkins Award ==
Fairfield University and the Regina A. Quick Center for the Arts established the Gerard Manley Hopkins Award for Excellence in the Arts in 1990. Hopkins was a Jesuit priest, but he was also one of the most important innovators in the history of English poetry. The Award recognizes artists who exhibit a spirit of innovation and new artistic ideas. The University and Quick Center have recognized several artists over the years, among them actor Jason Robards Jr., composer and lyricist Stephen Sondheim, painter Paul Cadmus, ballerina Gelsey Kirkland, and painter Robert Vickrey.

== Open VISIONS Forum ==
The Quick Center for the Art is home to the Open VISIONS Forum, a public outreach program of the University College engaging the 'life of the mind' with the Connecticut community. Its mission is to integrate the academic perspective of the university's students and faculty with the wide general interests of the local regional audience. Through an ongoing series of informative lectures, these 'public conversations' present eminent opinion-makers, artists, authors, and learned contributors to the humanities and sciences and civic and political commentators to engage audiences with topical issues facing a global and national agenda.

The 2007-2008 season is highlighted by two-time Pulitzer Prize-winning historian David McCullough and prize-winning NBC Nightly News anchor Brian Williams. Past guest speakers have included former prime minister of Pakistan Benazir Bhutto; documentary filmmaker Ken Burns; Forbes CEO and former presidential candidate Steve Forbes; former U.S. Ambassador to the United Nations Richard Holbrooke; United States Poet Laureate Robert Pinsky; Broadway legend Stephen Sondheim; and former hostage and author Terry Waite; and Emmy-winning broadcast journalist Bill O'Reilly.

== Notable performances ==
=== Chamber Music Society of Lincoln Center ===
The Quick Center for the Arts has been an annual tour destination since 2002 for the Chamber Music Society of Lincoln Center, "the nation's premier repertory company for chamber music." The ensemble tours nationally and internationally and in keeping with its mandate to reach a broad audience, CMSLC presents a three-part concert series at the Quick Center for the Arts.

=== Live Music Project ===
The Live Music Project, a conductorless orchestra, has been resident at the Quick Center since 2004. Founded by violinist Netta Hadari and composer Daniel Smith, the Live Music Project performs classical and modern works in a casual atmosphere.

=== Mendelssohn Choir of Connecticut ===
The Mendelssohn Choir of Connecticut is now the resident choir of the Quick Center for the Arts. The Mendelssohn Choir was formed in 1984 by members of the Fairfield University Chamber Singers, who, upon their graduation, wished to continue a musical association under the baton of Dr. Carole Ann Maxwell.
