= DiMenna–Nyselius Library =

DiMenna-Nyselius Library
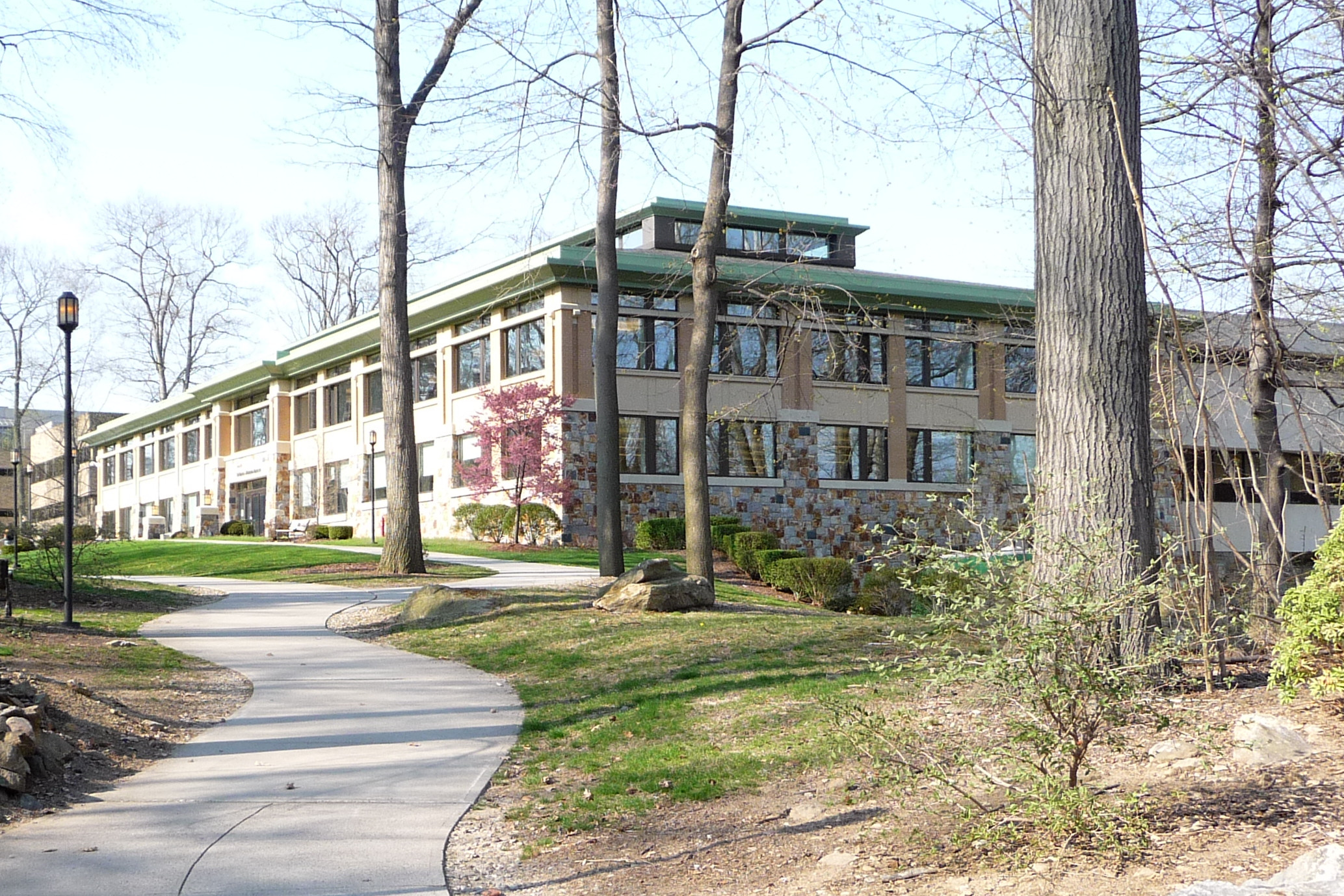
- 41.18153°N 73.29029°W
- Location: Fairfield, Connecticut

Access and use
- Population served: Fairfield University

Other information
- Director: Christina McGowan
- Website: www.fairfield.edu/library/

DiMenna–Nyselius Library is located on the campus of Fairfield University in Fairfield, Connecticut, USA.
