= Fairfield University =

Jesuit university in Connecticut, US

Coordinates: 41°9′36.61″N 73°15′29.04″W

- Former names: Fairfield University of St. Robert Bellarmine (1942–1944)
- Motto: Per Fidem ad Plenam Veritatem (Latin)
- Motto in English: Through Faith to the Fullness of Truth
- Type: Private university
- Established: 1942; 84 years ago
- Religious affiliation: Roman Catholic (Jesuit)
- Academic affiliations: AJCU ACCU NEASC NAICU Space-grant
- Endowment: $502.7 million (2025)
- President: Mark R. Nemec
- Provost: Christine Siegel
- Faculty: 729 total (484 FTE)
- Students: 6,864 (fall 2024)
- Undergraduates: 5,391 (fall 2024)
- Postgraduates: 1,473 (fall 2024)
- Location: Fairfield, Connecticut, U.S.
- Campus: 200 acres (81 ha); Suburban
- Fight song: "Hail Stags"
- Colors: Red & white
- Nickname: Stags
- Sporting affiliations: NCAA Division I – MAAC; NEISA
- Mascot: Lucas the Stag
- Website: fairfield.edu

Fairfield University is a private Catholic university in Fairfield, Connecticut, United States. It was founded by the Jesuits in 1942. In the fall of 2024, the university had about 5,400 full-time undergraduate students and 1,500 graduate students, including full-time and part-time students. It offers bachelor's degrees, master's degrees, and doctoral degrees through its five schools and colleges and, since 2023, associate degrees.

== History ==
In 1941, James H. Dolan, Provincial for the New England Province of the Society of Jesus, received written permission from Bishop Maurice F. McAuliffe of the Hartford Archdiocese to establish a Jesuit high school and college in the southwestern area of Connecticut. Fairfield University was officially founded in 1942 when the Jesuits acquired the two contiguous estates of the Brewster Jennings and Walter Lashar families. Upon its founding, it became the 26th Jesuit college/university in the United States.

In the same year, Dolan appointed John J. McEleney as the first president of the Fairfield University of St. Robert Bellarmine and Vicar of the Fairfield College Preparatory School. In 1944, Dolan became the second president. During his tenure, the State of Connecticut chartered Fairfield University to grant degrees in 1945. In 1947, the College of Arts and Sciences admitted its first class of 303 male students. The State of Connecticut accredited the College of Arts and Sciences and the university held its first summer session of undergraduate courses in 1949.

In 1970, Fairfield became co-educational, admitting its first undergraduate class of women. In the same year, the School of Nursing, which is now part of the Marion Peckham Egan School of Nursing and Health Studies was formed, offering four year undergraduate programs.

The 1971 Supreme Court case Tilton vs. Richardson established an important legal precedent concerning the Establishment Clause of the First Amendment and government financial assistance to religious-based colleges and universities. This landmark court case questioned the legality of Fairfield and three other Connecticut religious-based institutions securing federal construction grants under the Higher Education Facilities Act of 1963. An appeal by the plaintiffs was denied by the Supreme Court on June 28, 1971, ensuring Fairfield a significant amount of federal money which contributed to the construction of the Nyselius Library (1968) and Bannow Science Center (1971).

In 1978, the School of Business, now known as the Dolan School of Business, was established, as a separate and standalone school. Prior to this the Department of Business was part of the College of Arts and Sciences. At the same time, the school began offering its first graduate business degree program, a Master of Science in Financial Management.

Aloysius P. Kelley was installed as the school's seventh president in 1979. He has been Fairfield's longest serving leader, presiding over the school for 25 years. During his tenure, the relatively young school enjoyed a period of expansive growth. This period saw the construction of dozens of new campus buildings, the addition of multiple new undergraduate and graduate degree programs, and an increase the institution's endowment from under $2 million in 1979 to $131 million by 2003.

Under Kelley, the School of Engineering was formed after the acquisition of Bridgeport Engineering Institute in August 1994, offering both undergraduate and graduate degree programs. The university was accepted as a member institution into Phi Beta Kappa in 1995.

In 2004, Jeffrey P. von Arx became the eighth president of the university, having served as an administrator at fellow Jesuit institutions in Georgetown University and Fordham University prior. That year von Arx launched the capital campaign, "Our Promise: The Campaign for Fairfield University," which raised a then record of $137.9 million. The capital raised resulted in the construction and renovation of seven buildings, the creation of four new academic chairs, and the significant increase in the university's endowment. In October 2006, the school opened the Aloysius P. Kelley. S.J. Center, named in honor of its longtime president. The building in the center of campus is an environmentally friendly welcoming center and administrative center.

Years	President
1942–1944	John J. McEleney
1944–1951	James H. Dolan
1951–1958	Joseph D. FitzGerald
1958–1964	James E. FitzGerald
1964–1973	William C. McInnes
1973–1979	Thomas R. Fitzgerald
1979–2004	Aloysius P. Kelley
2004–2016	Jeffrey P. von Arx
2016–2017	Lynn M. Babington (interim)
2017–present	Mark R. Nemec

In 2017, Mark R. Nemec became the first lay president in the history of the University. In 2025, the school renamed the University’s College of Arts & Sciences to the John Charles Meditz College of Arts & Sciences in recognition of his gift of $50 million, the largest single donation by an individual in the history of the University.

== Academics ==
Fairfield University is composed of five schools and colleges: the John Charles Meditz College of Arts and Sciences, the Charles F. Dolan School of Business, the School of Engineering, the Marion Peckham Egan School of Nursing and Health Studies, and the School of Education and Human Development (formerly the Graduate School of Education and Allied Professions).

School	Founded
John Charles Meditz College of Arts and Sciences	1942
School of Education and Human Development	1950
Marion Peckham Egan School of Nursing and Health Studies	1970
Charles F. Dolan School of Business	1978
School of Engineering	1994

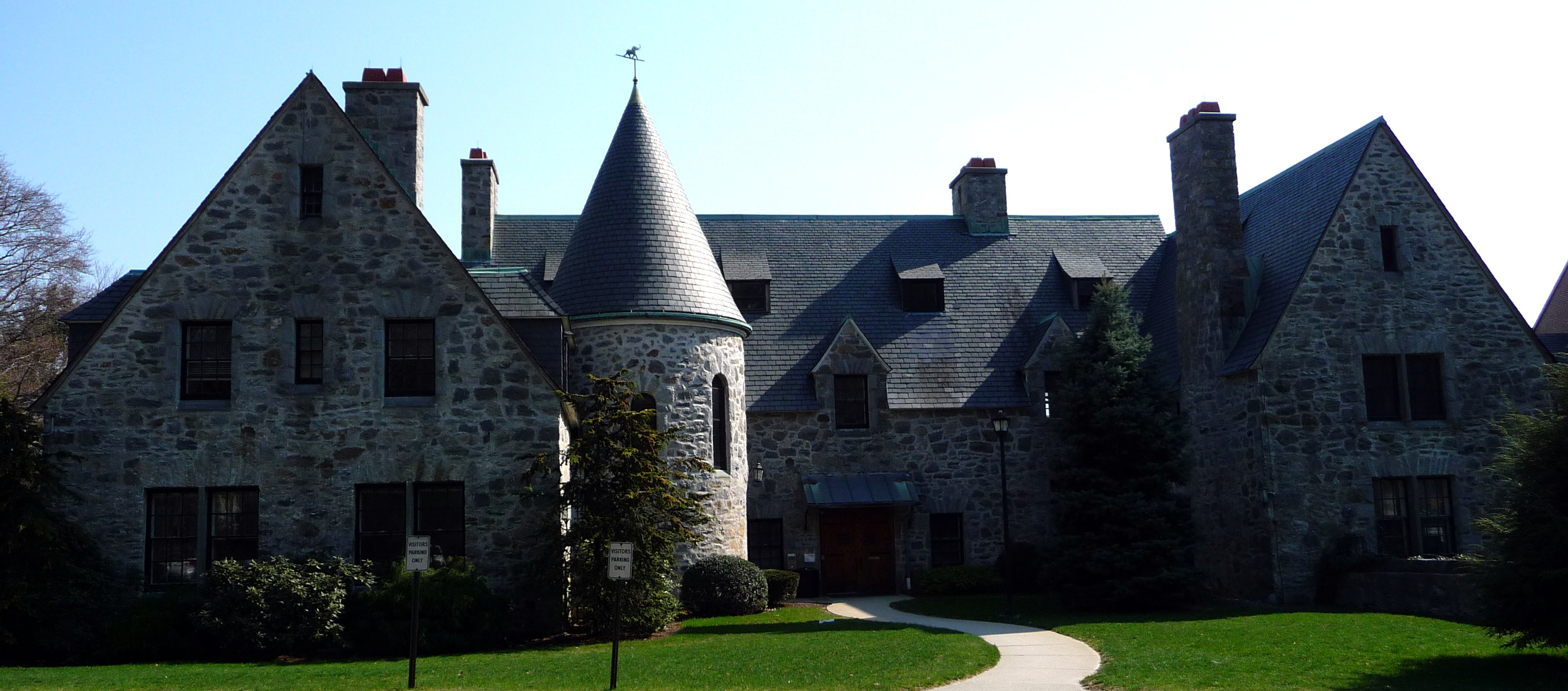
Dolan House, International Programs Center

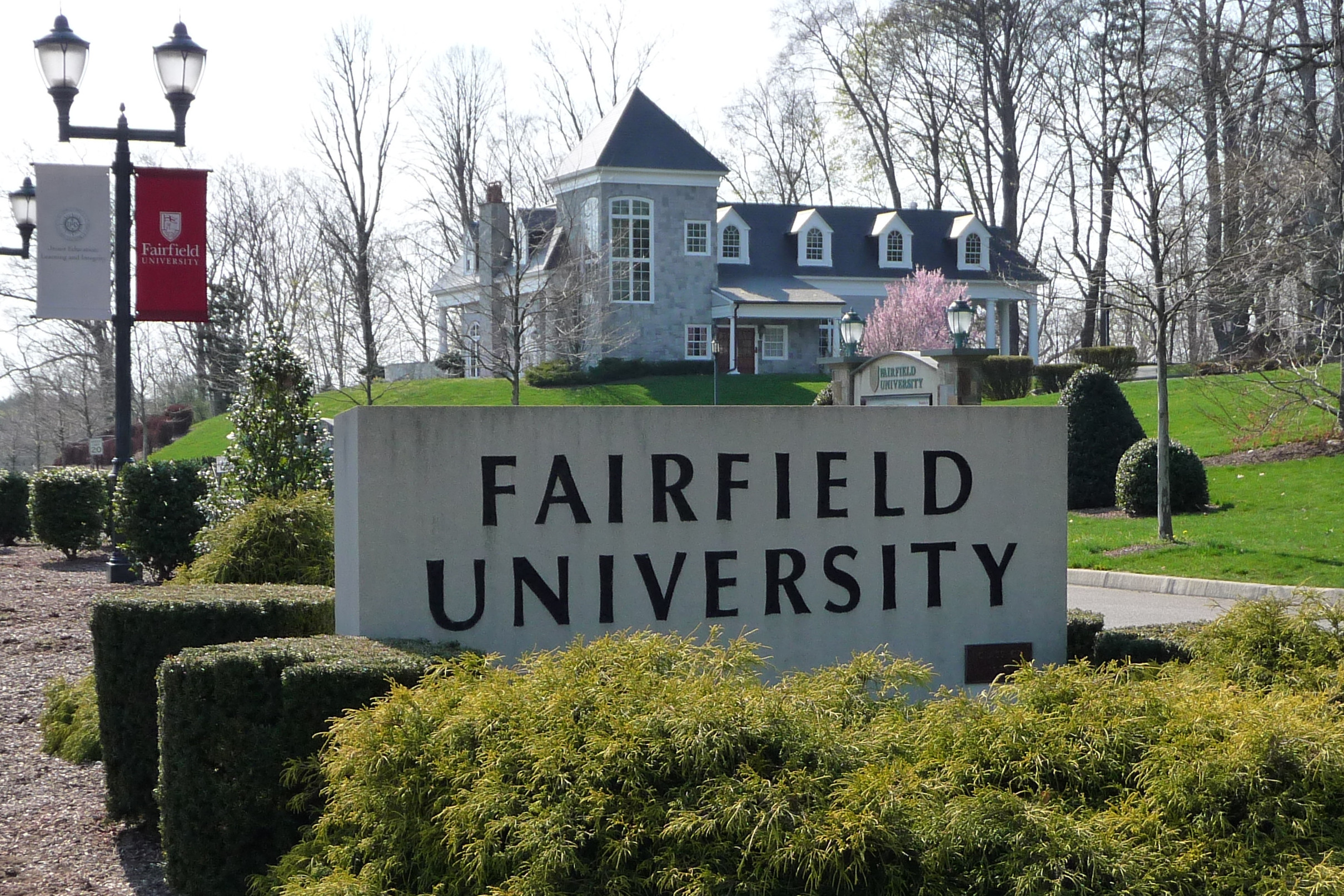
Main Entrance and Alumni House

The university offers 43 majors and 19 minors for undergraduate students, as well as 41 different graduate programs. In 2016–17, the university awarded 930 bachelor's degrees, 367 master's degrees, and 36 doctoral degrees. Since 1993, 65 Fairfield students have been awarded Fulbright Scholarships.

Academic and spiritual centers at the university include the Center for Social Impact, the Center for Catholic Studies, the Murphy Center for Ignatian Spirituality, and the Carl and Dorothy Bennett Center for Judaic Studies.

Among undergraduates, in 2017 the most popular majors ranked in order of popularity were nursing, finance, marketing, accounting, communication, psychology, biology, and English. The first-year student retention rate was 90% and the four-year graduation rate was 83%.

In the fall of 2017, the faculty to student ratio was 12:1. The average class size was 22 students and 80% of classes had under 30 students in them. There were 270 full-time and 319 part-time faculty members. Of the full-time faculty, 90% had a doctorate, 3% had a terminal master's, and 7% had a master's.

In 2023, the university opened a campus in Bridgeport’s East End; Fairfield Bellarmine offers associate degrees for low-income students.

=== Rankings ===
Academic rankings

Master's
- Washington Monthly: 122

National
- Forbes: 242
- U.S. News & World Report: 109
- WSJ/College Pulse: 199

The university was tied for 132nd overall for 2025 among "National Universities" by U.S. News & World Report, 45th for "Best Undergraduate Teaching", second for "Most Innovative", and 131st for "Best Value" in the National category. In 2021, Washington Monthly ranked Fairfield University 122nd among 614 Master's universities in the U.S. based on its contribution to the public good, as measured by social mobility, research, and promoting public service.

=== Undergraduate admissions ===
According to U.S. News & World Report, Fairfield is deemed a "More Selective" university. The school accepts the Common Application for admission. In the Fall of 2010, the school moved to a "test optional" admissions policy but recommended scheduling an interview for students who do not submit standardized test scores. Approximately 90% of students receive some type of financial assistance. Fairfield has the lowest percentage of Pell Grant recipients of any college in the United States.

Fairfield has become considerably more selective in recent years. For fall 2025 the university received 21,299 freshmen applications — a 69% increase over the 12,586 received for fall 2020 — and admitted 5,336 (25.1%), down from an admit rate of 56.1% five years earlier. The entering class of 1,513 was the largest in the university's history and its most academically credentialed: enrolled freshmen averaged a 3.71 GPA, with the middle 50% range of composite SAT scores rising to 1280–1370 (640–700 evidence-based reading and writing, 630–690 math) and the ACT composite range to 29–32. The university received 21,662 applications for fall 2026, the largest applicant pool in its history, admitting 21%.

Fairfield University Admissions
	2025	2020	2015
Applicants	21,299	12,586	10,767
Admits	5,336	7,065	6,995
Admit rate	25.1	56.1	65.0
Enrolled	1,513	1,118	966
Yield rate	28.4	15.8	13.8
Average GPA	3.71	3.64	3.41
SAT evidence-based reading and writing	640–700	600–670	540–630
SAT math	630–690	590–670	560–640
ACT composite	29–32	27–30	25–29

== Region and campus ==
The Fairfield University campus area is a census-designated place (CDP); it first appeared as a CDP in the 2020 Census with a population of 2,884.

=== Town of Fairfield ===
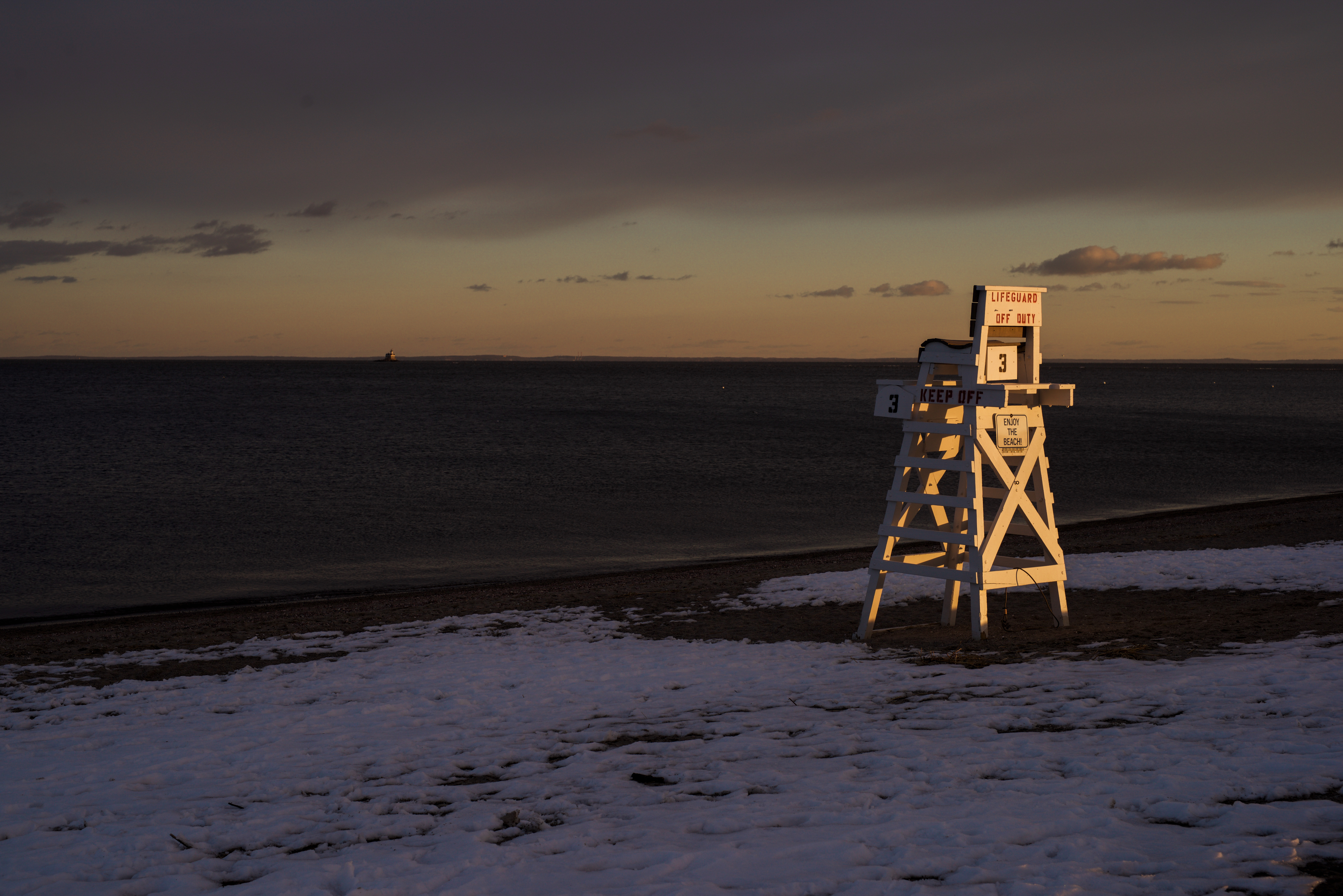
Penfield Beach in Fairfield

Fairfield University is located in Fairfield, Connecticut, a coastal town along Long Island Sound. It is less than 60 miles from New York City and approximately 1 hour 20 minutes away by Metro-North Railroad. As of the 2010 census, the town had a population of 59,404. Fairfield is known for its historic downtown, and its beaches - Jennings and Penfield Beach - which are only a few miles from the university campus.

=== Main campus ===
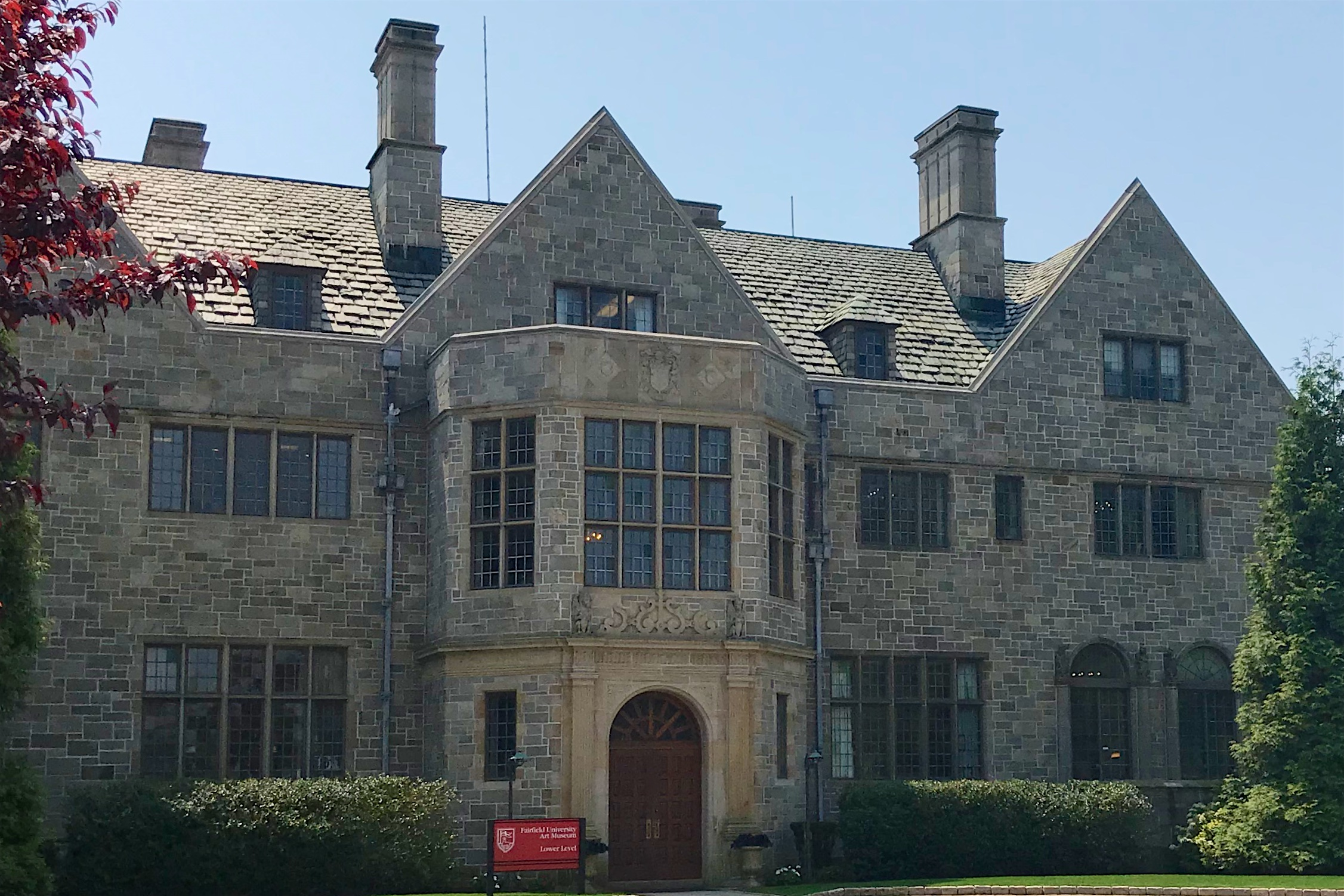
The university's provost and president's offices are in Bellarmine Hall, which also features Fairfield's art museum.

Fairfield's 200-acre (0.81 km^{2}) campus consists of 35 buildings anchored by the three manor homes of the original estates: Bellarmine Hall (1921), formerly the Lashar's 'Hearthstone Hall', renamed to honor Robert Bellarmine, a Jesuit saint; McAuliffe Hall (1896), originally O.G. Jennings' 'Mailands', renamed for Bishop Maurice F. McAuliffe, who sanctioned the creation of Fairfield University; and David J. Dolan House, Lawrence Jenning's "Larribee", dedicated to honor the uncle of Charles F. Dolan who made the 1989 acquisition of Dolan Campus possible.

Bellarmine Hall, the main administration building on campus, is named in honor of Robert Bellarmine. Many of the classrooms and residence halls on the campus are also named in honor of Jesuit priests.

The Barone Campus Center (named in honor of university Provost and Chemistry Professor Dr. John Barone), is the home for student life including the Tully Dining Commons, the Oak Room, the Main Dining Hall, offices for FUSA, StagCard, WVOF, Residence Life, and Student Affairs.

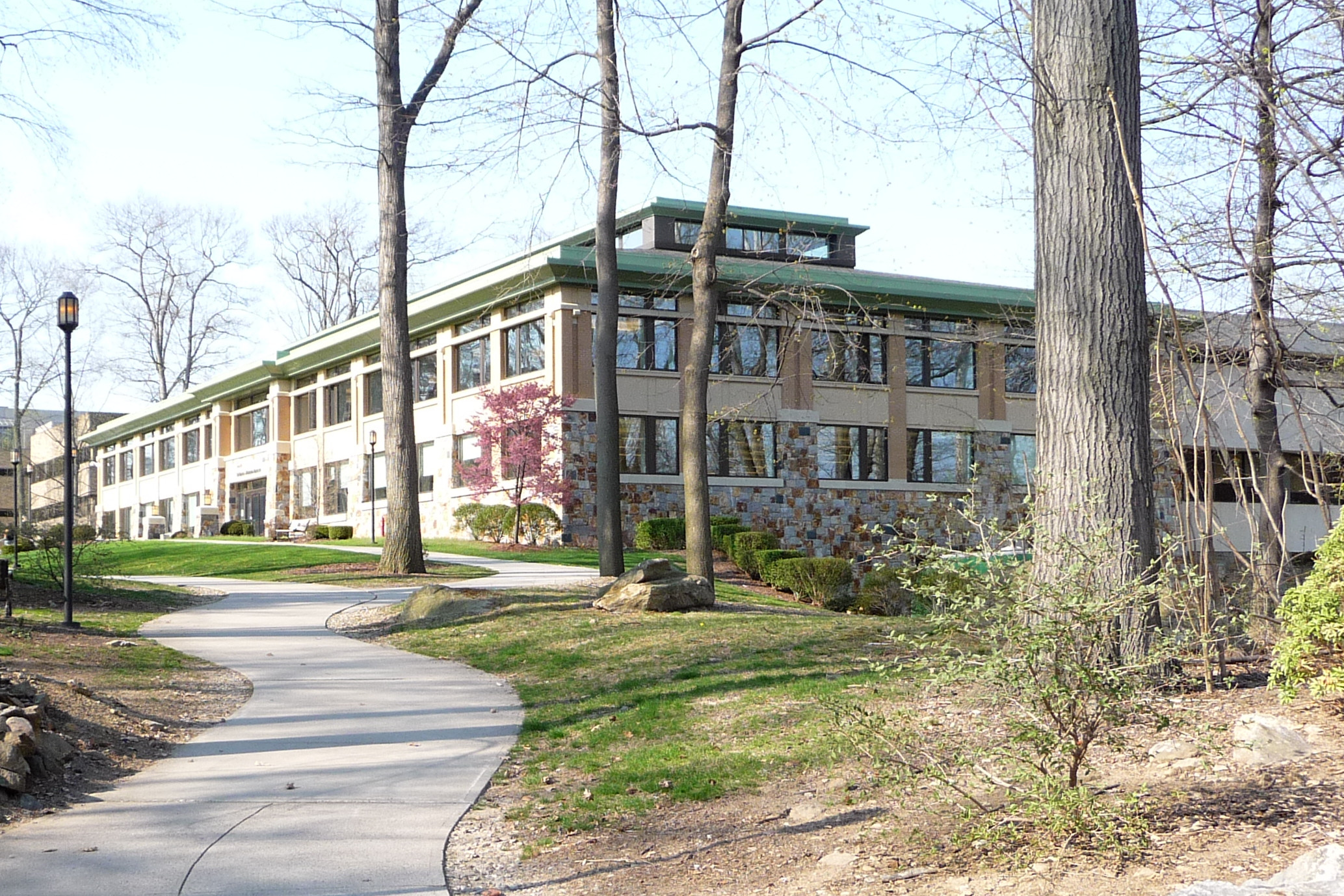
DiMenna-Nyselius Library

Built in 1968, the DiMenna-Nyselius Library originally was named the Nyselius Library in honor of benefactors Gustav and Dagmar Nyselius. They were Swedish immigrants who had settled in Stamford and wanted to make a donation to Fairfield University. In 2001, the Library underwent a major renovation and expansion and was renamed the DiMenna-Nyselius Library in recognition of a donation from alumnus Joseph A. DiMenna, Jr. '80.

The campus is home to Fairfield College Preparatory School (Fairfield Prep), which is a 900-student all-male preparatory high school that has been aligned with the college since its founding in 1942. It is located at the southeastern corner of the campus, near the entrance on North Benson Road.

=== Environmental sustainability ===
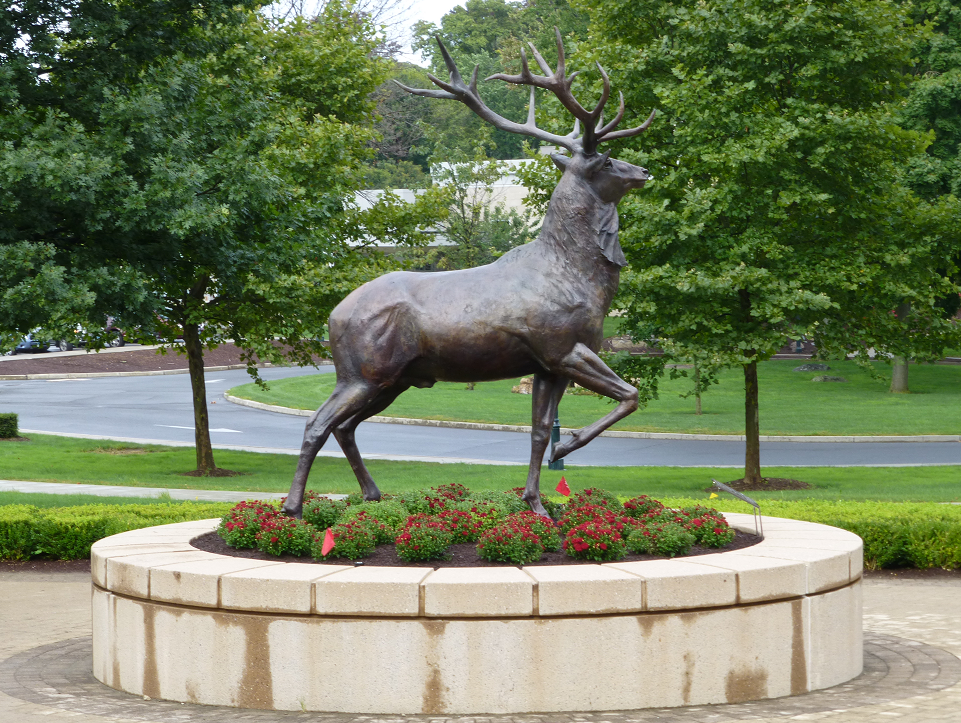
Stag statue in the middle of campus

In 2007, the university opened a $9.5 million combustion turbine-based combined heat and power plant on its campus with a capacity of 4.6 MW; the university was honored by the United States Environmental Protection Agency (EPA) with a 2010 Energy Star CHP Award for the project. In 2008, university president von Arx signed the American College & University Presidents' Climate Commitment, a high-visibility effort to address global warming by garnering institutional commitments to neutralize greenhouse gas emissions, and to accelerate the climate change mitigation efforts in research and education.

In 2011, a $12.5 million, 22,000-square-foot (2,000 m^{2}) contemporary-style home for the Jesuit priests of Fairfield University (then numbering 22) was completed; the building is located near the center of campus and contains sustainable elements. In August 2009, Fairfield University became the first university in the United States to install Tomra UNO reverse vending machines (RVM), an all-in-one recycling machine for bottle deposits.

== Student life ==
Student body composition as of May 2, 2022
Race and ethnicity	Total
White	81%
Hispanic	7%
Asian	2%
Other (Note: Other consists of Multiracial Americans & those who prefer to not say.)	2%
Foreign national	2%
Other (Note: Other consists of Multiracial Americans & those who prefer to not say.)	2%
Black	1%
Economic diversity
Low-income (Note: The percentage of students who received an income-based federal Pell grant intended for low-income students.)	7%
Affluent (Note: The percentage of students who are a part of the American middle class at the bare minimum.)	93%

=== Community service ===
The goal of Jesuit education is homines pro aliis, "men and women for others". As a result, Fairfield students are involved in many community service opportunities. Fairfield was among 119 colleges in the United States named to the Carnegie Classification for Community Engagement in 2008. The university was named to the 2009 and 2010 President's Higher Education Community Service Honor Roll by the Learn and Serve America Program of the Corporation for National and Community Service.

The Annual Hunger Clean Up is a one-day service-a-thon where the university community works at 40-plus local agency sites throughout Fairfield County and to raise money for local and national hunger and homelessness causes. The Fairfield chapter of Colleges Against Cancer hosts an annual Relay for Life for the American Cancer Society, an overnight event designed to spread awareness of cancer prevention, treatments and cures, celebrate cancer survivors and raise money for cancer research. The Adrienne Kirby Family Literacy Project, recognized as a model program by the Corporation for National and Community Service, involves about 175 Fairfield student-volunteers a year in providing individual tutoring to preschool children at the Action for Bridgeport Community Development's Early Learning/Head Start Program.

Internationally, Ignatian Solidarity Corps volunteers annually participate in two-week international service trips during their spring and winter breaks traveling to Ecuador, Mexico, Jamaica, Belize and Haiti. In 2004, Mikaela Conley '06 and Aamina Awan '07 founded The Afghan Children's Project to raise awareness and funds for children who have suffered the effects of war, violence, and poverty in Afghanistan. Both were interviewed on CNN Daybreak in August 2005 for their work in funding the building of a water well for Aloudine, a small village outside Kabul. And in 2008, nine Fairfield students, inspired by 2006 Nobel Peace Prize recipient Muhammad Yunus and the Grameen Bank, started Sustainable Equity for Women, a micro-lending project designed to raise and invest money in small businesses run by women in developing countries in conjunction with Kiva Microfunds.

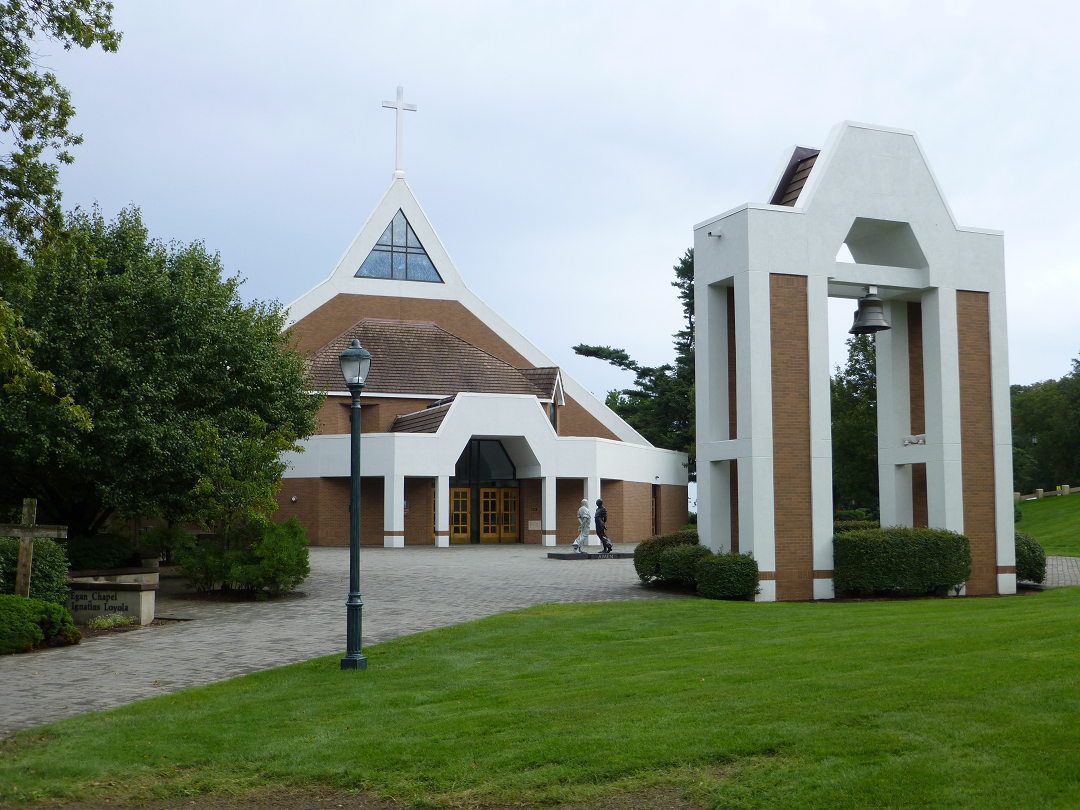
Egan Chapel of St. Ignatius of Loyola

=== Fairfield University Student Association ===
The Fairfield University Student Association (FUSA) is the official student association for full-time undergraduate students and is the largest student organization on campus. The association exists to represent student issues and concerns to the faculty and administration and to sponsor a multitude of student programs and activities. All full-time undergraduate students are members. The association is organized into three branches – legislative, executive, and the judiciary (FUSA Court). The legislative branch consists of the Student Senate, comprising 20 elected representatives (5 from each undergraduate class year). The executive branch is headed by the popularly elected President of FUSA, who serves as the official spokesperson for undergraduate students in addition to administering the student association on a daily basis. In 2002, Karen Donoghue '03 became the first woman elected President of FUSA. The FUSA President is assisted by a popularly elected vice president, elected class officers, and a number of other appointed officers, including the Director of Programming, the Director of the Club Operations and Student Organisations(COSO), the Director of Marketing & Public Relations, the Director of the Treasury, and the Director of Diversity and Inclusion. The judicial branch, known as the FUSA Court, facilitates elections, serves as a hearing body in appeals, as well as performing the judicial functions required for the student association.

=== Student activism ===
A central tenet of a Jesuit education is the promotion of the values of peace and social justice. In 1988, 1989 and 1990, the Coalition for a Better World constructed "Cardboard City" and held a 36-hour vigil, and again in 2008, the Students for Social Justice constructed "Homeless Village" and hosted the "Oxfam Hunger Banquet" to raise awareness of the plight of the homeless in the United States. In 1999, students staged an 11-hour sit-in at the home of the university president and later a hunger strike to protest a contracting company used by the university that the students said was anti-union and paid janitors poorly. Each year, the Students for Social Justice travel to Columbus, Georgia for the annual School of the Americas Watch protest at a combat training school for Latin American soldiers now known as the Western Hemisphere Institute for Security Cooperation. The date of the protest marks the anniversary of the murder of six Jesuit priests, their maid, and her daughter in El Salvador at the hands of soldiers trained at the School of the Americas. And in 2008, Fairfield for Peace NOW created "Hope Trail", a pathway of flags around campus symbolizing the cost in life and casualties from the Iraq War, and A Cry For Peace, a play written and performed with Theatre Fairfield demonstrating the toll of the Iraq War on the families of soldiers back in the United States.

=== Student media ===
- StagsTV – The Student Television Station of Fairfield University
- The Mirror – The Independent Student Newspaper of Fairfield University
- WVOF – The Voice of Fairfield University

== Athletics ==
Fairfield athletics monogram

Fairfield University is a member of the Metro Atlantic Athletic Conference (MAAC) and is classified as NCAA Division I for a majority of its athletic programs. It sponsors 20 varsity sports – baseball, men's and women's basketball, men's and women's crew, men's and women's cross country, field hockey, men's and women's golf, men's and women's lacrosse, men's and women's soccer, softball, men's and women's swimming and diving, men's and women's tennis, and women's volleyball.

The men's lacrosse team is a member of the Colonial Athletic Association and field hockey is an associate member of the Northeast Conference.

Sport clubs offer baseball, equestrian, men's and women's ice hockey, martial arts, men's and women's rugby, sailing, men's and women's skiing and snowboarding, men's and women's soccer, men's and women's track and men's and women's volleyball.

== Arts and culture ==
=== Center for Arts & Minds ===
The Center for Arts & Minds, founded in 2024, is the university's organizational body for arts and culture on campus. It seeks to forge and maintain partnerships with various creative bodies throughout southwestern Connecticut, fostering collaboration and creativity. Arts & Minds stakeholders on campus include:

- The Regina A. Quick Center for the Arts
- The Fairfield University Art Museum
- The Carl & Dorothy Bennett Center for Judaic Studies
- The Center for Social Impact
- The Patrick J. Waide Center for Applied Ethics
- The Center for Coastal, Climate, and Marine Studies

=== Quick Center for the Arts ===
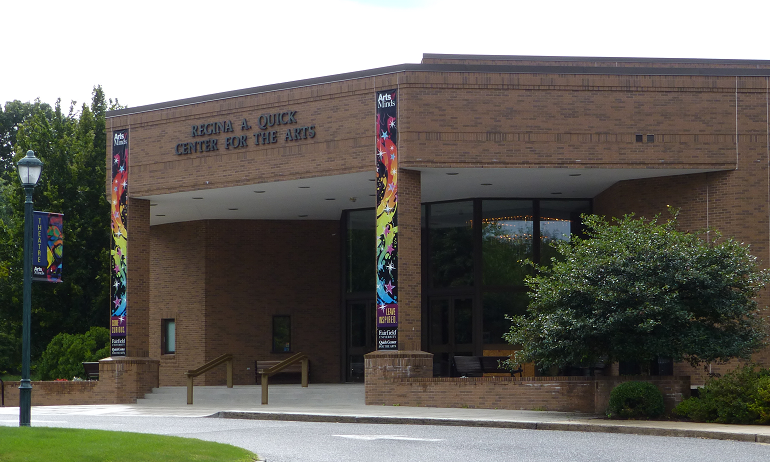
Quick Center for the Arts

The Regina A. Quick Center for the Arts is the major center of theatre and the arts at Fairfield. The center opened in 1990 and hosts events such as popular and classical music, dance, theatre, and programs for young audiences. It houses the 740-seat Kelley Theatre, the 150-seat Lawrence A. Wien Experimental (Black Box) Theatre, and the Thomas J. Walsh Jr. Art Gallery.

The center is home to the Open VISIONS Forum, which under the direction of Dr. Philip Eliasoph brings speakers to campus to participate in dialogue about topical issues.

Participants have included: Bari Weiss, Douglas Brinkley, Molly Jong-Fast, William F. Buckley Jr., Lesley Stahl, Philippe de Montabello, Dominick Dunne, Christopher Hitchens, Liz Cheney, Salman Rushdie, Stephen SondheimAmbassador Susan Rice, Senator Cory Booker, Andrea Mitchell, and Dustin Hoffman.

=== Fairfield University Art Museum ===
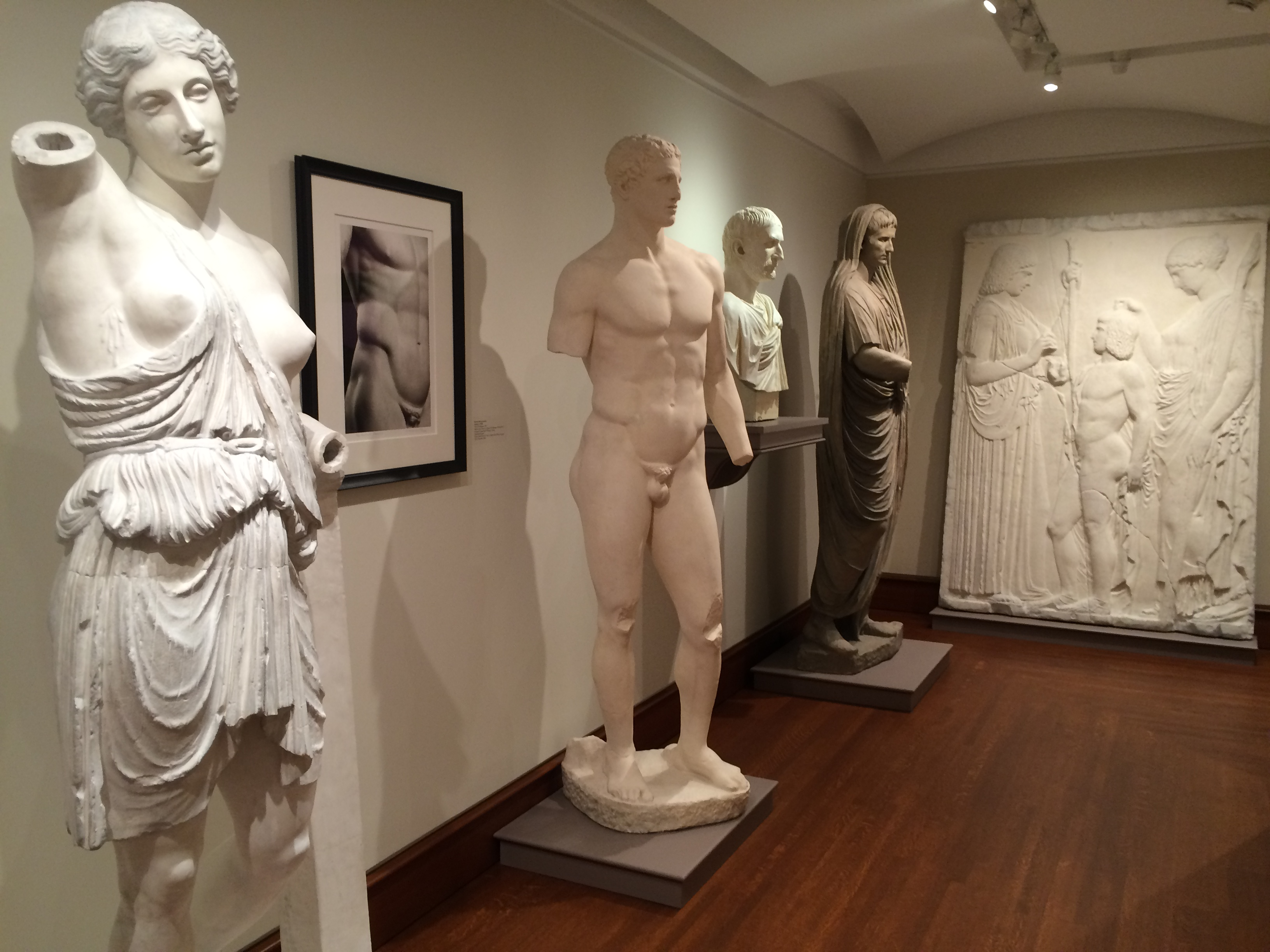
Fairfield University Art Museum

The Fairfield University Art Museum, opened in October 2010, is located in a 1920s Tudor mansion. The Museum features four galleries with about 2,700 square feet (250 m^{2}) of space. Its main gallery, The Frank and Clara Meditz Gallery, is named in honor of the parents of the lead donor to the project, University Trustee John Meditz '70. It was previously known as the Bellarmine Museum.

=== Theatre Fairfield ===
Theatre Fairfield is the resident production company of the Theatre Program of the Department of Visual & Performing Arts at the university. Theatre Fairfield's season includes professionally directed and designed productions, a Festival of student-written, directed, and designed plays, performances by On the Spot, an improv company, Director's Cut or A Class Act, which features the work of advanced directing and acting students, and independent projects created by junior and senior theatre majors. The PepsiCo Theatre, a renovated 1922 carriage house, is the home to Theatre Fairfield. This theatrical facility includes a 70-seat flexible black box theatre, coffeehouse, dance studio, design studio and costume shop/dressing room. Veterans of Theatre Fairfield include Paul Marcarelli '92 and January LaVoy '97.

=== Bennett Center for Judaic Studies ===
Founded in 1993 via a gift from Carl and Dorothy Bennett (founders of Caldor department stores), the Bennett Center for Judaic Studies has served Fairfield students and faculty and is engaged in substantial community outreach. It plans and executes about 20 public events every year, including lectures, conversations, movie screenings, and art performances, some in collaboration with the Regina A. Quick Center for the Arts. Since the October 7th attacks on Israel, the Gaza War that ensued, campus protests at nearby universities, and the overall rise in antisemitic incidents throughout the country, the Bennett Center has served as one of few university centers in the Northeast where programming about Israeli and Jewish topics could be held without protests, disruption, or retribution. Bennett Center programs have attracted an increasing audience since. The Bennett Center also oversees the minor in Judaic Studies, offers programming around Shabbat and Jewish holidays for the university's Jewish students, and advises the Jewish student group Kadima.

The center's founding director is Ellen Umanski, who directed it until her retirement in 2020. Its current director is Yaron Ayalon, a historian of Sephardi Jews, Israel, and the Ottoman Empire, and Professor of Religious Studies and Carl and Dorothy Bennett Chair in Judaic Studies.

== Alumni ==
- In academia and education, Fairfield alumni include: Rebecca Cunningham, President of the University of Minnesota, J. Kevin Dorsey, President of the Southern Illinois University; Katherine Lapp, Executive Vice President of Harvard University; David J. McCarthy Jr., Dean Emeritus of the Georgetown University Law Center; Thomas Poon, President of Loyola Marymount University; Mark Reed, President of Loyola University of Chicago; Charles E. Schaefer, psychology professor considered the "Father of Play Therapy."
- In arts and entertainment, alumni include: Pat Jordan, author of A False Spring; Donald Preziosi, art historian and former Slade Professor of Fine Art at Oxford University; Bob Sullivan, two time New York Times Best Seller author and founding member of MSNBC.com; John Skoyles, poet and professor emeritus at Emerson College; Peter McCann, country/pop-rock songwriter for Whitney Houston and more.
- In business and finance, alumni include: Donatella Arpaia, New York's 50 Most Powerful Women; E. Gerald Corrigan, seventh President of the Federal Reserve Bank of New York; William P. Egan, venture capitalist; John L. Flannery, Chairman & CEO of General Electric (GE); Kathleen Murphy, Fortune Magazine's 50 Most Powerful Business Women; Joseph DiMenna, hedge fund manager; Christopher McCormick, president & CEO of L.L.Bean; Jennifer Piepszak, COO of JPMorgan Chase; Ronan Ryan, Irish-American businessperson
- In law and government, alumni include: John A. Danaher III, United States Attorney for the District of Connecticut; Raymond J. Dearie, Judge of the United States Foreign Intelligence Surveillance Court; Joseph P. Flynn and William J. Lavery, Chief Judges of the Connecticut Appellate Court; Martin Looney, Connecticut Senate President Pro Tempore; Jorge E. Pérez-Díaz, Attorney General of the Commonwealth of Puerto Rico; Steven Stafstrom, Connecticut Judiciary Committee Chairman.
- In medicine and science, alumni include: James Lewis Abbruzzese, Chief of the Division of Medical Oncology at the Duke Cancer Institute; Tatiana Foroud, genetic researcher and Distinguish Professor at the Indiana University School of Medicine; John T. Lis, Guggenheim Fellow and Barbara McClintock Professor of Molecular Biology & Genetics at Cornell University; Brian Monahan, Attending Physician of the United States Congress; Peter Pronovost, 2008 Time 100 World's Most Influential People and MacArthur Fellow; Caitlin O'Connell-Rodwell, world-renowned elephant expert.
- In social justice, alumni include: G. Simon Harak, Pax Christi National Peacemaker of the Year; Paula Donovan, the founding executive director of AIDS-Free World; Joseph Moylan, founder and president of Durham Nativity School.
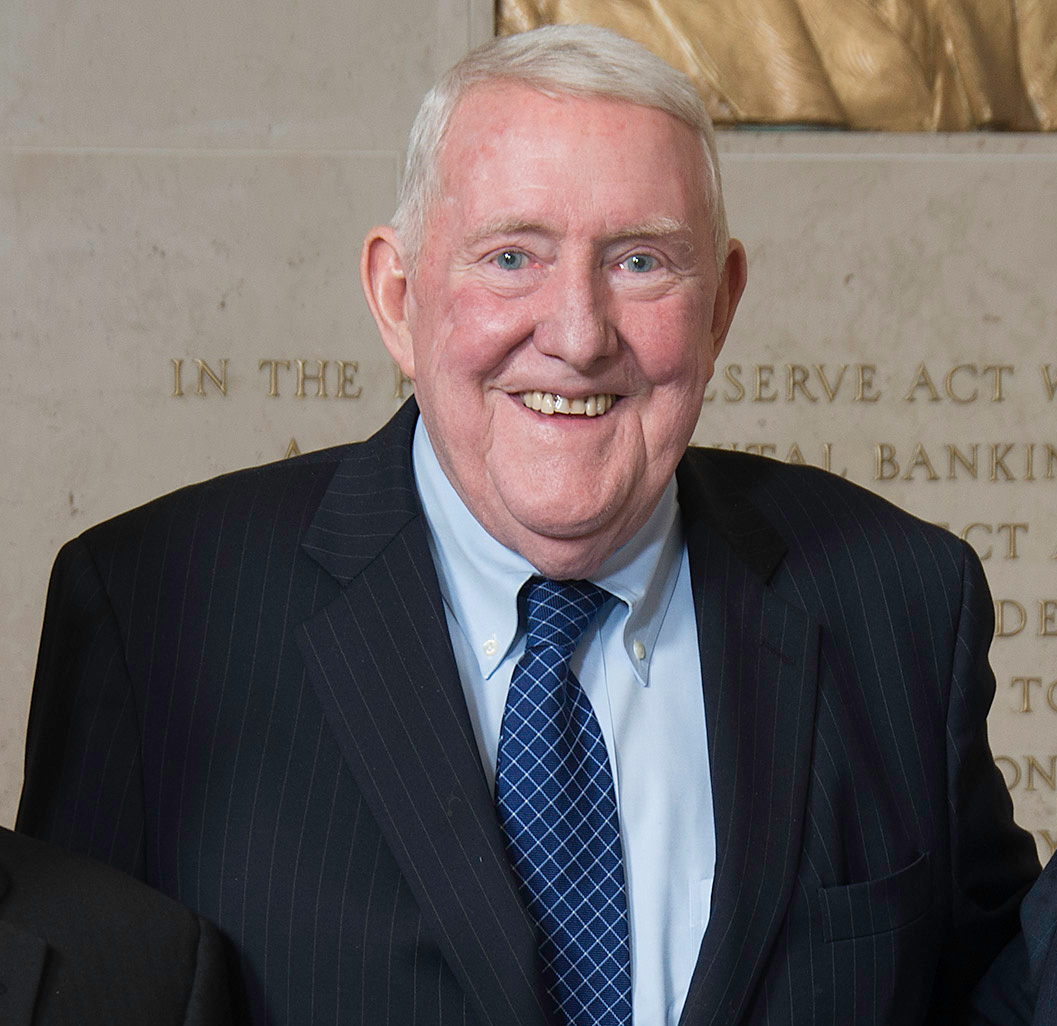
E. Gerald Corrigan
7th President of Federal Reserve Bank of New York

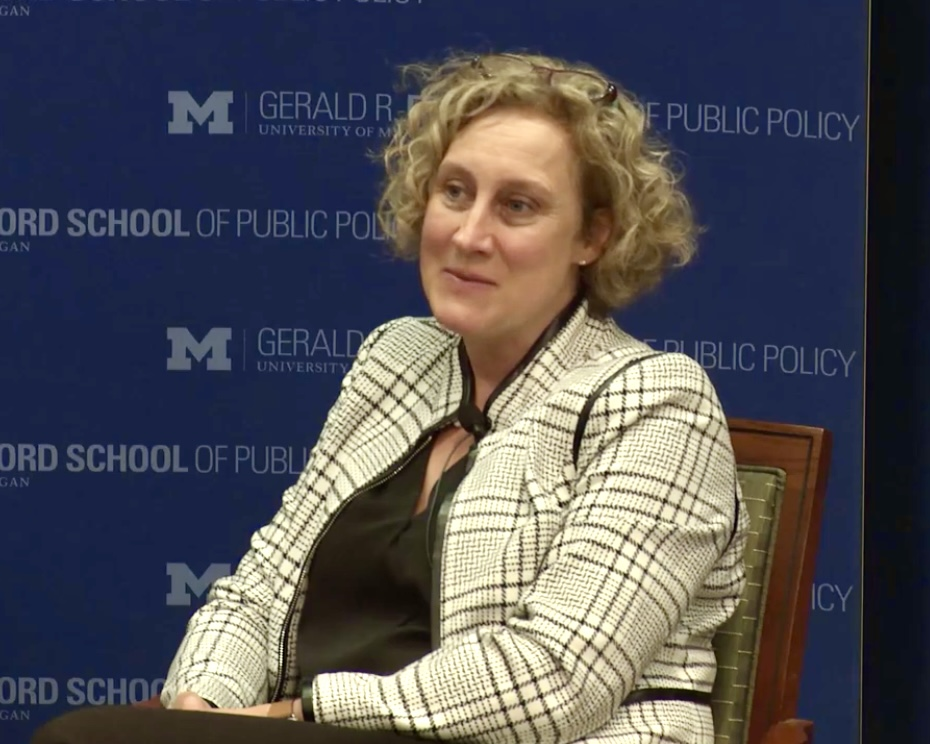
Rebecca Cunningham
18th President of the University of Minnesota

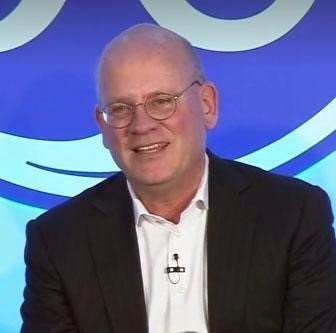
John L. Flannery
CEO of General Electric (GE)

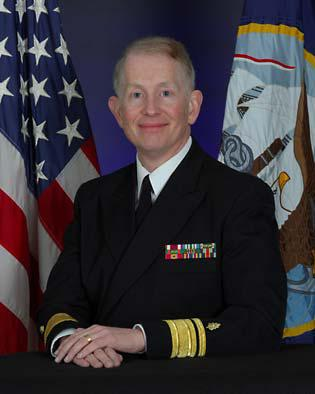
Brian Monahan
Attending Physician of the United States Congress

Kathleen Murphy
President of Fidelity Personal Investing, who has been named to the Fortune 50 Most Powerful Women in Business

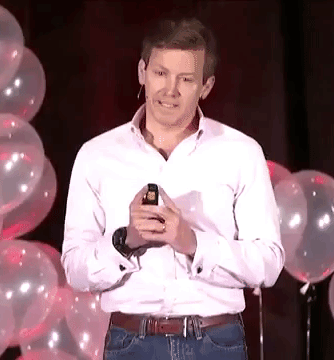
Peter Pronovost
Chief Quality and Transformation Officer at University Hospitals Cleveland Medical Center, who was named to the Time 100 Most Influential People in the World list in 2008

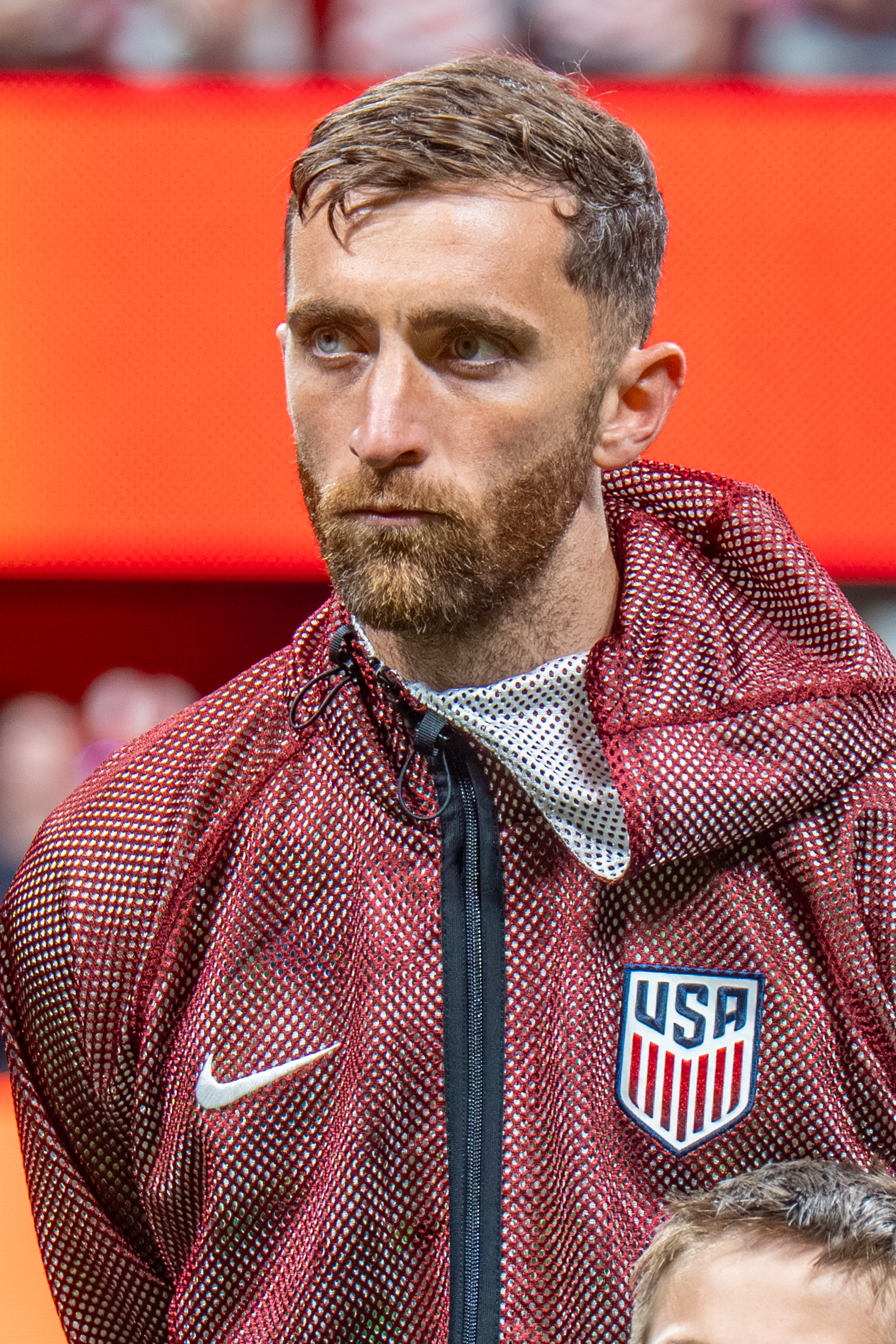
Matt Turner
USMNT
Goalkeeper

== See also ==
- List of Jesuit sites
