= Apostles' Creed =

Early statement of Christian belief

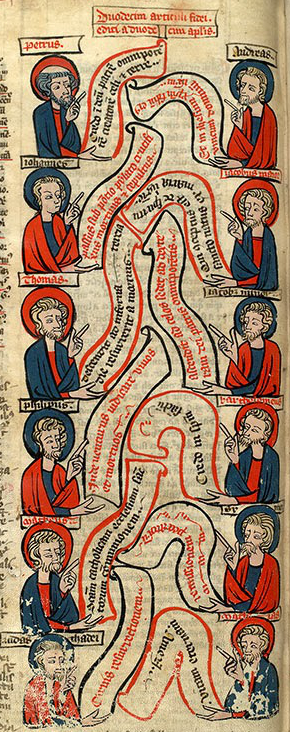
Medieval Credo Apostolorum, dated c. 1300 (Bibliothèque Mazarine ms. 0924 f. 150v). The sequence of attribution to the apostles is: 1. Peter, 2. Andrew, 3. John, 4. James, son of Zebedee,5. Thomas, 6. James, son of Alphaeus, 7. Philip, 8. Bartholomew, 9. Matthew, 10. Simon the Zealot, 11. Jude Thaddaeus, 12. Matthias.

The Apostles' Creed (Latin: Symbolum Apostolorum or Symbolum Apostolicum), sometimes titled the Apostolic Creed or the Symbol of the Apostles, is a Christian creed or "symbol of faith".

The creed most likely originated as a development of the Old Roman Symbol: the old Latin creed of the 4th century. It has been used in the Latin liturgical rites since the 8th century and, by extension, in the various modern branches of Western Christianity, including the modern liturgy and catechesis of Roman Catholicism, Evangelical Lutheranism, Reformed (Continental Reformed, Presbyterian, Congregationalist, Calvinistic Methodist and Reformed Baptist traditions), Moravianism, Anglicanism and Methodism.

It is shorter than the full Niceno-Constantinopolitan Creed adopted in 381, but it is explicitly trinitarian in structure, with sections affirming belief in God the Father, God the Son, and God the Holy Spirit. It does not address some Christological issues defined in the Nicene Creed. It says nothing explicitly about the divinity of Jesus or the Holy Spirit. For this reason, it was held to predate the Nicene Creed in medieval Latin tradition.

The expression "Apostles' Creed" is first mentioned in a letter from the Synod of Milan dated AD 390, referring to a belief at the time that each of the Twelve Apostles contributed an article to the twelve articles of the creed.

== History ==
The ecclesiastical use of Latin symbolum for 'creed'—in the sense of "a distinctive mark of Christians", from the sense of Greek σύμβολον, 'a sign or token used for identification'—first occurs around the middle of the 3rd century, in the correspondence of St. Cyprian and St. Firmilian, the latter in particular speaking of the trinitarian formula as the "Symbol of the Trinity", and recognizing it as an integral part of the rite of baptism.

The term Symbolum Apostolicum appears for the first time in a letter, probably written by Ambrose, from a Council in Milan to Pope Siricius in about AD 390: "Let them give credit to the Symbol of the Apostles, which the Roman Church has always kept and preserved undefiled". Ambrose's term is here referring to the Old Roman Creed, the immediate predecessor of what is now known as the Apostles' Creed. The narrative of this creed having been jointly created by the Apostles, with each of the twelve contributing one of twelve articles, was already current at that time.

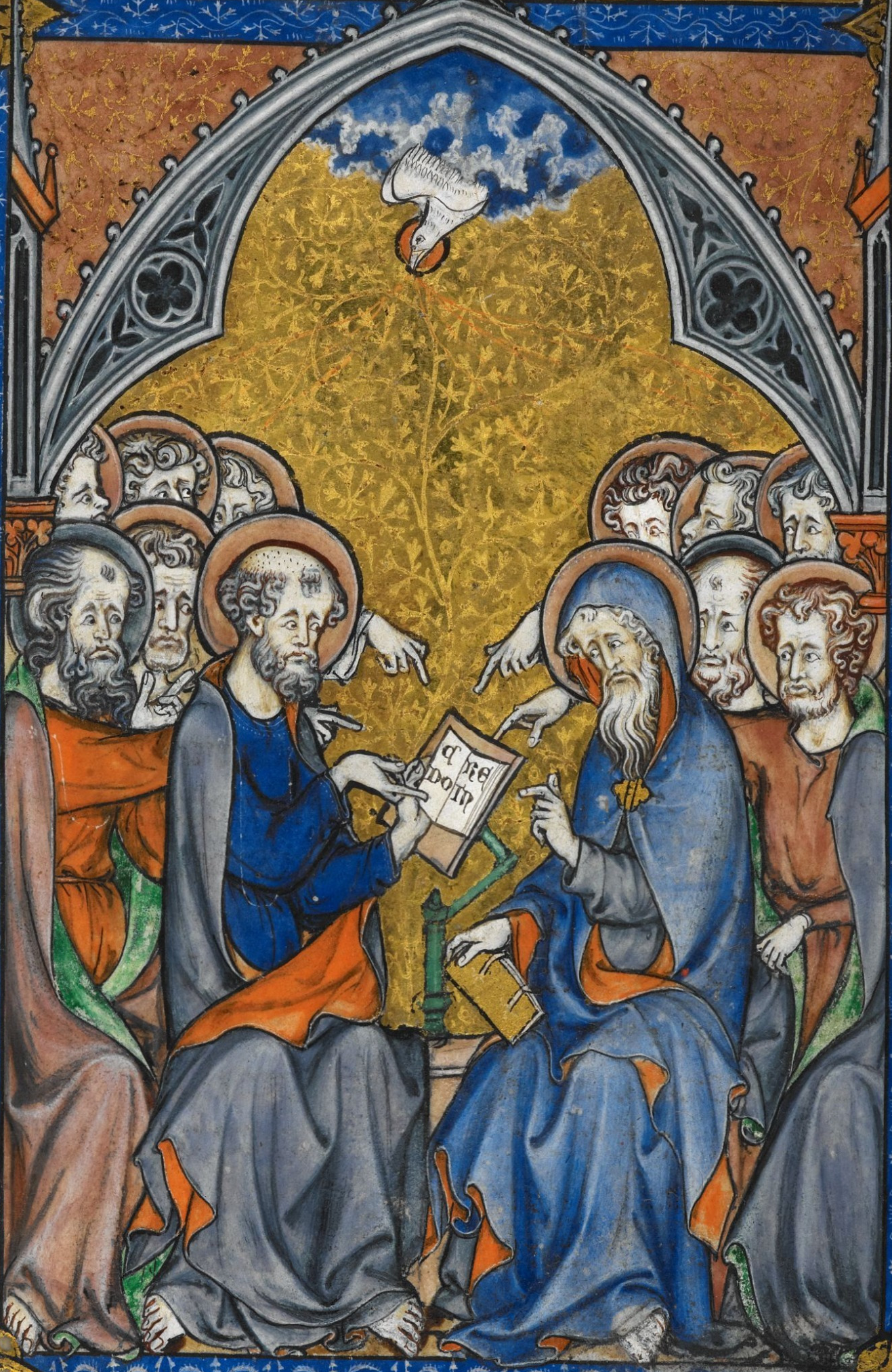
This illumination from a 13th-century manuscript shows the apostles writing the Creed, receiving inspiration from the Holy Spirit.

The Old Roman Creed had evolved from simpler texts based on Matthew 28:19, part of the Great Commission, and it has been argued that this earlier text was already in written form by the late 2nd century (c. 180).

The earliest known formula is found within Testamentum in Galilaea D[omini]. N[ostri]. I[esu]. Christi written between 150 and 180. This formula states: "[I believe] in the Father almighty, – and in Jesus Christ, our Savior; – and in the Holy Spirit, the Paraclete, in the holy Church, and in the remission of sins." As can be seen, it lacks the Christological part of the Old Roman Creed.

While the individual statements of belief that are included in the Apostles' Creed – even those not found in the Old Roman Symbol – are found in various writings by Irenaeus, Tertullian, Novatian, Marcellus, Rufinus, Ambrose, Augustine, Nicetas, and Eusebius Gallus, the earliest appearance of what we know as the Apostles' Creed was in the De singulis libris canonicis scarapsus ('Excerpt from Individual Canonical Books') of St. Pirminius (Migne, Patrologia Latina 89, 1029 ff.), written between 710 and 714. Bettenson and Maunder state that it is first from Dicta Abbatis Pirminii de singulis libris canonicis scarapsus (idem quod excarpsus, excerpt), c. 750.

The text of what is now known as the Apostles' Creed was most likely developed in southern Gaul around the midpoint of the 5th century. A creed that is virtually identical to the current one is recorded by Faustus of Riez. It is possible that Faustus had the identical text, as the original text written by Faustus cannot be reconstructed with certainty. A version that is identical to the current one with the single exception of infera in place of inferos is recorded in the late 5th century. However, the Old Roman Creed remained the standard liturgical text of the Roman Church throughout the 4th to 7th centuries. It was replaced by the "Gallic" version of the Apostles' Creed only in the later 8th century, under Charlemagne, who imposed it throughout his dominions.

The phrase descendit ad inferos ('he descended into hell') is not found in the Nicene Creed. It echoes Ephesians 4:9, "κατέβη εἰς τὰ κατώτερα μέρη τῆς γῆς" ('he descended into the lower earthly regions'). This phrase first appeared in one of the two versions of Rufinus (d. 411), the Creed of Aquileia, and then did not appear again in any version of the creed until AD 650. Similarly, the references to the communion of saints is found neither in the Old Roman Symbol nor in the Nicene Creed. The reference to God as "creator of heaven and earth" likewise is not in the Nicene Creed of 325, but it is present in the extended version of the Nicene Creed (the Niceno-Constantinopolitan Creed) of 381.

The Eastern Orthodox Church does not use the Apostles' Creed, not because of an objection to any of its articles, but because of its omissions necessary for the definition of Nicene Christianity. The Eastern Orthodox delegates at the Council of Florence (1431–1449) explicitly challenged the western tradition that attributed the Apostles' Creed to the Twelve Apostles. This tradition was also shown to be historically untenable by Lorenzo Valla. The Roman Church does not state that text dates back to the Apostles themselves, the Roman catechism instead explaining that "the Apostles' Creed is so called because it is rightly considered to be a faithful summary of the apostles' faith."

== Text ==
The following gives the original Latin text, with the traditional division into twelve articles, alongside an English translation. Underlined passages are those not present in the Old Roman Symbol as recorded by Tyrannius Rufinus.

Credo
The Creed in Latin spoken with the Ecclesiastical pronunciation of Latin

1. Credo in Deum Patrem omnipotentem, Creatorem cæli et terræ,	I believe in God the Father almighty, Maker of heaven and earth,
2. et in Iesum Christum, Filium Eius unicum, Dominum nostrum,	and in Jesus Christ, His only Son, our Lord,
3. qui conceptus est de Spiritu Sancto, natus ex Maria Virgine,	who was conceived of the Holy Spirit and born of the Virgin Mary,
4. passus sub Pontio Pilato, crucifixus, mortuus, et sepultus,	who suffered under Pontius Pilate, was crucified, died, and was buried,
5. descendit ad inferos, tertia die resurrexit a mortuis,	descended into hell, rose again from the dead on the third day,
6. ascendit ad cælos, sedet ad dexteram Dei Patris omnipotentis,	ascended into heaven and is seated at the right hand of God the Father almighty,
7. inde venturus est; iudicare vivos et mortuos.	who will come again to judge the living and the dead.
8. Credo in Spiritum Sanctum,	I believe in the Holy Spirit,
9. sanctam Ecclesiam catholicam, sanctorum communionem,	the holy catholic Church, the communion of saints,
10. remissionem peccatorum,	the forgiveness of sins,
11. carnis resurrectionem,	the resurrection of the body,
12. vitam æternam. Amen.	and the life everlasting. Amen.

There is also a received Greek text, which alongside the Latin is found in the Psalterium Græcum et Romanum, erroneously ascribed to Pope Gregory the Great. It was first edited by Archbishop Ussher in 1647, based on a manuscript preserved in the library of Corpus Christi College, Cambridge, England. The Latin text agrees with the "Creed of Pirminius" edited by Charles Abel Heurtley (De Fide Symbolo, 1900, p. 71). Four other Greek translations with slight variations were discovered by Carl Paul Caspari, and published in 1879 (Alte und neue Quellen zur Geschichte des Taufsymbols, vol. 3, pp. 11 sqq.).

The tradition of assigning each article to one of the apostles specifically can be traced to the 6th century. In Western sacral art, Credo Apostolorum refers to the figurative representation of the twelve apostles each alongside one of the articles. This artistic tradition extends from the high medieval to the Baroque period.

The precise division of the text and the sequence of attribution to the apostles has never been entirely fixed. For example, Pelbartus Ladislaus of Temesvár, writing in the late 15th century, divides article 5 in two but combines articles 11 and 12 into one, with the following attributions:

- 1. Peter,
- 2. John,
- 3. James, son of Zebedee,
- 4. Andrew,
- 5a. Philip,
- 5b. Thomas,
- 6. Bartholomew,
- 7. Matthew,
- 8. James, son of Alphaeus,
- 9. Simon the Zealot,
- 10. Jude Thaddaeus,
- 11–12. Matthias.

== Liturgical use in Western Christianity ==
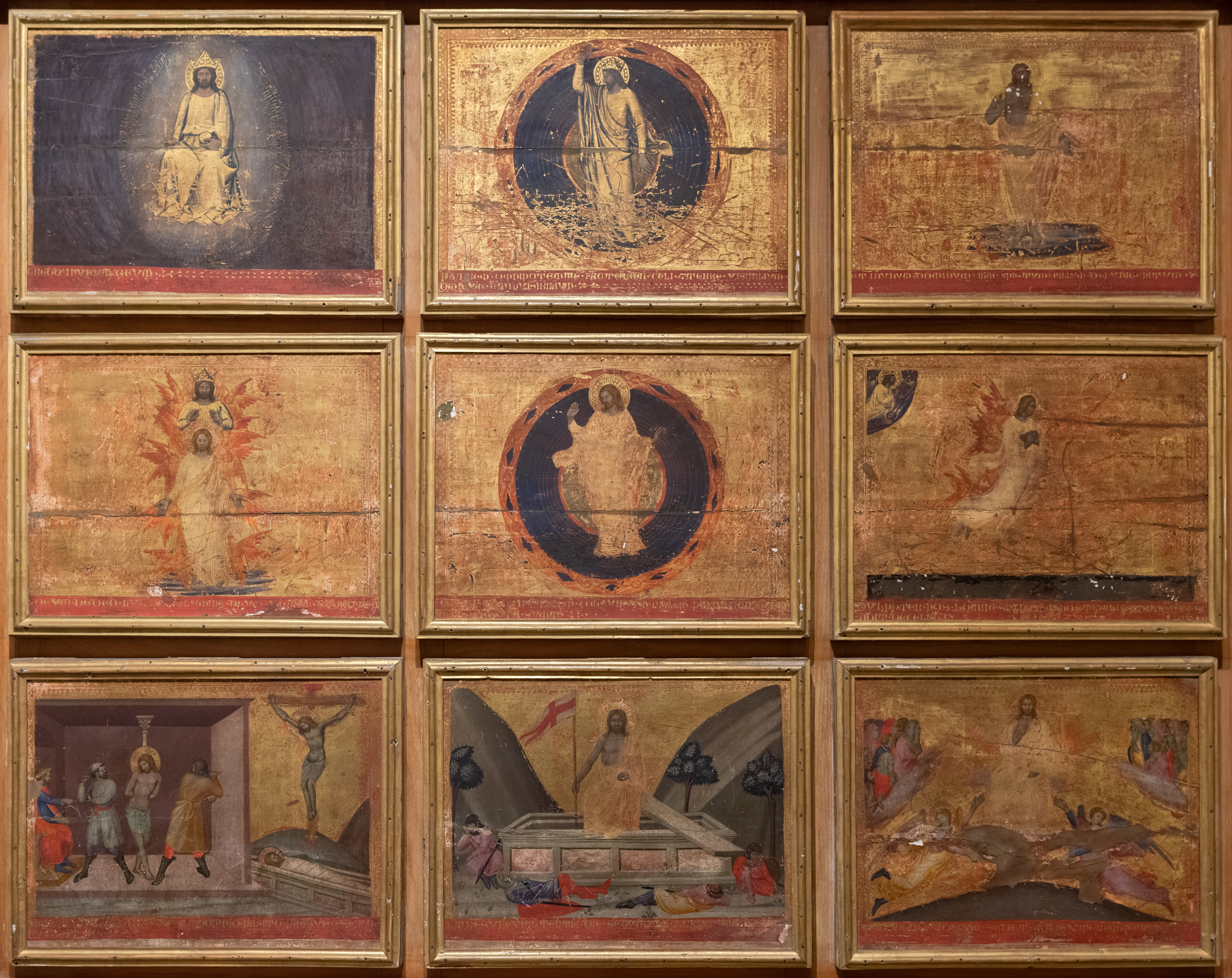
Benedetto di Bindo, Articles of the Creed, 1412

The Apostles' Creed is used in its direct form or in interrogative forms by Western Christian communities in several of their liturgical rites, in particular those of baptism and the Eucharist.

=== Rite of baptism ===
The Apostles' Creed, whose present form is similar to the baptismal creed used in Rome in the third and fourth centuries, actually developed from questions addressed to those seeking baptism. The Catholic Church today uses an interrogative form of it in the Rite of Baptism (for both children and adults). In the official English translation (ICEL, 1974) the minister of baptism asks:

Do you believe in God, the Father almighty, creator of heaven and earth?
Do you believe in Jesus Christ, his only Son, our Lord, who was born of the Virgin Mary, was crucified, died, and was buried, rose from the dead, and is now seated at the right hand of the Father?
Do you believe in the Holy Spirit, the holy catholic Church, the communion of saints, the forgiveness of sins, the resurrection of the body, and life everlasting?

To each question, the catechumen, or, in the case of an infant, the parents and sponsor(s) (godparent(s)) in his or her place, answers "I do." Then the celebrant says:

This is our faith. This is the faith of the Church. We are proud to profess it, in Christ Jesus our Lord.

And all respond: Amen.

The Presbyterian Church of Aotearoa New Zealand uses the Apostles' Creed in its baptism rite in spite of the reservations of some of its members regarding the phrase "born of the virgin Mary".

The Episcopal Church in the United States of America uses the Apostles' Creed as part of a Baptismal Covenant for those who are to receive the Rite of Baptism. The Apostles' Creed is recited by candidates, sponsors and congregation, each section of the Creed being an answer to the celebrant's question, "Do you believe in God the Father (God the Son, God the Holy Spirit)?" It is also used in an interrogative form at the Easter Vigil in The Renewal of Baptismal Vows.

The Church of England likewise asks the candidates, sponsors and congregation to recite the Apostles' Creed in answer to similar interrogations, in which it avoids using the word God of the Son and the Holy Spirit, asking instead: "Do you believe and trust in his Son Jesus Christ?", and "Do you believe and trust in the Holy Spirit?" Moreover, "where there are strong pastoral reasons", it allows use of an alternative formula in which the interrogations, while speaking of "God the Son" and "God the Holy Spirit", are more elaborate but are not based on the Apostles' Creed, and the response in each case is: "I believe and trust in him." The Book of Common Prayer may also be used, which in its rite of baptism has the minister recite the Apostles' Creed in interrogative form. Asking the godparents or, in the case "of such as are of Riper Years", the candidate: "Dost thou believe in God the Father ..." The response is: "All this I stedfastly believe."

Lutherans following the Lutheran Service Book (Lutheran Church–Missouri Synod and the Lutheran Church–Canada), like Catholics and Anglicans, use the Apostles' Creed during the Sacrament of Baptism:

Do you believe in God, the Father almighty, maker of heaven and earth?
Do you believe in Jesus Christ, His only son, our Lord, who was conceived by the Holy Spirit, born of the virgin Mary, suffered under Pontius Pilate, was crucified, died and was buried; He descended into hell; the third day He rose again from the dead; He ascended into heaven and sits at the right hand of God the Father Almighty; from thence He will come to judge the living and the dead?
Do you believe in the Holy Spirit, the holy Christian Church, the communion of saints, the forgiveness of sins, the resurrection of the body, and the life everlasting?

Following each question, the candidate answers: "Yes, I believe". If the candidates are unable to answer for themselves, the sponsors are to answer the questions.

For ELCA (Evangelical Lutheran Church in America) Lutherans who use the Evangelical Lutheran Worship book, the Apostles' Creed appears during the Sacrament of Holy Baptism Rite on p. 229 of the hardcover pew edition.

The United Methodist Church in the United States uses the Apostles' Creed as part of their baptismal rites in the form of an interrogatory addressed to the candidate(s) for baptism and the whole congregation as a way of professing the faith within the context of the Church's sacramental act. For infants, it is the professing of the faith by the parents, sponsors, and congregation on behalf of the candidate(s); for confirmands, it is the professing of the faith before and among the congregation. For the congregation, it is a reaffirmation of their professed faith.

Do you believe in God?
I believe in God, the Father Almighty, creator of heaven and earth.
Do you believe in Jesus Christ?
I believe in Jesus Christ, his only Son, our Lord, who was conceived by the Holy Spirit, born of the Virgin Mary, suffered under Pontius Pilate, was crucified, died, and was buried; he descended to the dead. On the third day he rose again; he ascended into heaven, is seated at the right hand of the Father, and will come again to judge the living and the dead.
Do you believe in the Holy Spirit?
I believe in the Holy Spirit, the holy catholic church, the communion of saints, the forgiveness of sins, the resurrection of the body, and the life everlasting.

=== Eucharistic rite ===
Since the 2002 edition, the Apostles' Creed is included in the Roman Missal as an alternative, with the indication, "Instead of the Niceno-Constantinopolitan Creed, especially during Lent and Easter time, the baptismal Symbol of the Roman Church, known as the Apostles' Creed, may be used." Previously the Nicene Creed was the only profession of faith that the Missal gave for use at Mass, except in Masses for children; but in some countries use of the Apostles' Creed was already permitted.

=== Canonical hours ===
The Apostles' Creed is used in Anglican services of Matins and Evening Prayer (Evensong). It is invoked after the recitation or singing of the Canticles, and is the only part of the services in which the congregation traditionally turns to face the altar, if they are seated transversely in the quire.

The Episcopal Church (United States) uses the Apostles' Creed in Morning Prayer and Evening Prayer.

Before the 1955 simplification of the rubrics of the Roman Breviary by Pope Pius XII, the Apostles' Creed was recited at the beginning of matins and prime, at the end of compline, and in some preces (a series of versicles and responses preceded by, eleison ("Lord, have mercy") and the Our Father) of prime and compline on certain days during Advent and Lent.

== Indulgence ==
Recitation of the Apostles' Creed or the Nicene-Constantinopolitan Creed is required to obtain a partial indulgence.

== Liturgical English translations ==
=== Ecumenical (interdenominational) versions ===
==== International Consultation on English Texts ====
The International Consultation on English Texts (ICET), a first inter-church ecumenical group that undertook the writing of texts for use by English-speaking Christians in common, published Prayers We Have in Common (Fortress Press, 1970, 1971, 1975). Its version of the Apostles' Creed was adopted by several churches.

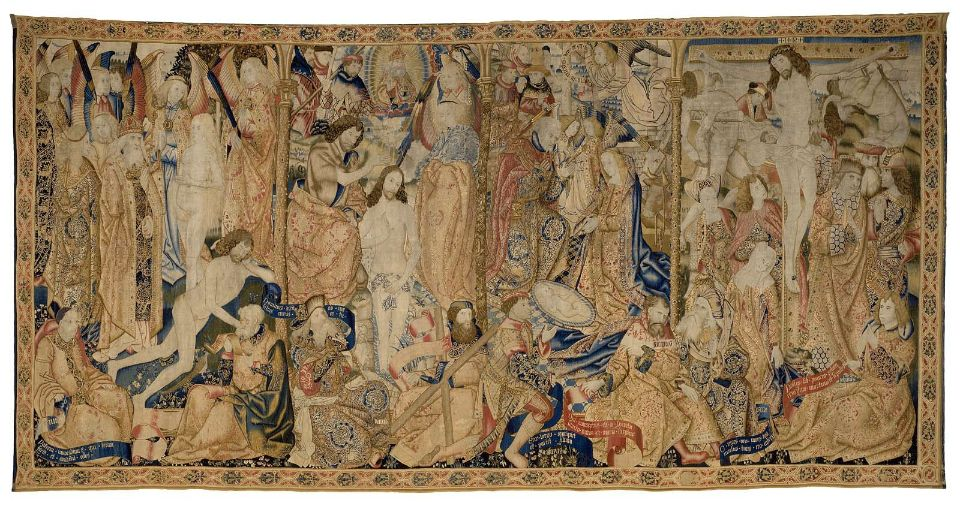
15th-century Flemish tapestry illustrating the first four articles of the Creed

I believe in God, the Father almighty,
creator of heaven and earth.
I believe in Jesus Christ, his only Son, our Lord.
He was conceived by the power of the Holy Spirit
and born of the virgin Mary.
He suffered under Pontius Pilate,
was crucified, died, and was buried.
He descended to the dead.
On the third day he rose again.
He ascended into heaven,
and is seated at the right hand of the Father.
He will come again to judge the living and the dead.
I believe in the Holy Spirit,
the holy catholic Church,
the communion of the saints,
the forgiveness of sins,
the resurrection of the body,
and the life everlasting. Amen.

==== English Language Liturgical Consultation ====
The English Language Liturgical Consultation (ELLC), a successor body to the International Consultation on English Texts (ICET), published in 1988 a revised translation of the Apostles' Creed. It avoided the word his in relation to God and spoke of Jesus Christ as "God's only Son" instead of "his only Son". In the fourth line, it replaced the personal pronoun he with the relative who, and changed the punctuation, so as no longer to present the Creed as a series of separate statements. In the same line it removed the words the power of. It explained its rationale for making these changes and for preserving other controverted expressions in the 1988 publication Praying Together, with which it presented its new version:

I believe in God, the Father almighty,
creator of heaven and earth.
I believe in Jesus Christ, God's only Son, our Lord,
who was conceived by the Holy Spirit,
born of the Virgin Mary,
suffered under Pontius Pilate,
was crucified, died, and was buried;
he descended to the dead.
On the third day he rose again;
he ascended into heaven,
he is seated at the right hand of the Father,
and he will come to judge the living and the dead.
I believe in the Holy Spirit,
the holy catholic Church,
the communion of saints,
the forgiveness of sins,
the resurrection of the body,
and the life everlasting. Amen.

=== Catholic Church ===
The initial (1970) English official translation of the Roman Missal of the Roman Catholic Church adopted the ICET version, as did catechetical texts such as the Catechism of the Catholic Church.

In 2008, the Catholic Church published a new English translation of the texts of the Mass of the Roman Rite, the use of which came into force at the end of 2011. It included the following translation of the Apostles' Creed:

I believe in God,
the Father almighty,
Creator of heaven and earth,
and in Jesus Christ, his only Son, our Lord,
who was conceived by the Holy Spirit,
born of the Virgin Mary,
suffered under Pontius Pilate,
was crucified, died and was buried;
he descended into hell;
on the third day he rose again from the dead;
he ascended into heaven,
and is seated at the right hand of God the Father almighty;
from there he will come to judge the living and the dead.
I believe in the Holy Spirit,
the holy catholic Church,
the communion of saints,
the forgiveness of sins,
the resurrection of the body,
and life everlasting.
Amen.

=== Church of England ===
In the Church of England there are currently two authorized forms of the creed: that of the Book of Common Prayer (1662) and that of Common Worship (2000).

Book of Common Prayer, 1662

I believe in God the Father Almighty,
Maker of heaven and earth:

And in Jesus Christ his only Son our Lord,
Who was conceived by the Holy Ghost, (Note: In a suggested revision of 1923, this line has "of the Holy Ghost". The Scottish Book of Common Prayer (1637) has "which was conceived of the holy Ghost". This goes back to the 1559 Book of Common Prayer, which has "whiche was conceived of the holy Ghost".)
Born of the Virgin Mary,
Suffered under Pontius Pilate,
Was crucified, dead, and buried:
He descended into hell;
The third day he rose again from the dead;
He ascended into heaven,
And sitteth on the right hand of God the Father Almighty;
From thence he shall come to judge the quick and the dead.

I believe in the Holy Ghost;
The holy Catholick Church;
The Communion of Saints;
The Forgiveness of sins;
The Resurrection of the body,
And the Life everlasting.
Amen.

Common Worship

I believe in God, the Father almighty,
creator of heaven and earth.

I believe in Jesus Christ, his only Son, our Lord,
who was conceived by the Holy Spirit,
born of the Virgin Mary,
suffered under Pontius Pilate,
was crucified, died, and was buried;
he descended to the dead.
On the third day he rose again;
he ascended into heaven,
he is seated at the right hand of the Father,
he will come to judge the living and the dead.

I believe in the Holy Spirit,
the holy catholic Church,
the communion of saints,
the forgiveness of sins,
the resurrection of the body,
and the life everlasting.
Amen.

=== Lutheran Church ===
In Martin Luther's preface to his 'Small Catechism' which makes up part of the Book of Concord that contains the symbolical documents of the Lutheran Church, it is suggested to commit the Creed, along with the Decalogue and Lord's Prayer to memory.

==== Evangelical Lutheran Worship ====
The publication Evangelical Lutheran Worship published by Augsburg Fortress, is the primary worship resource for the Evangelical Lutheran Church in America, the largest Lutheran denomination in the United States, and the Evangelical Lutheran Church in Canada. It presents the official ELCA version, footnoting the phrase "he descended to the dead" to indicate an alternative reading: "or 'he descended into hell', another translation of this text in widespread use".

The text is as follows:

I believe in God, the Father almighty,
creator of heaven and earth.

I believe in Jesus Christ, God's only Son, our Lord,
who was conceived by the Holy Spirit,
born of the virgin Mary,
suffered under Pontius Pilate,
was crucified, died, and was buried;
he descended to the dead.*
On the third day he rose again;
he ascended into heaven,
he is seated at the right hand of the Father,
and he will come to judge the living and the dead.

I believe in the Holy Spirit,
the holy catholic church, (Note: Another alternative reading is "Christian church" instead of catholic to differentiate it from the Catholic Church.)
the communion of saints,
the forgiveness of sins,
the resurrection of the body,
and the life everlasting. Amen.

==== Church of Denmark ====
The Church of Denmark started using the phrase, from the baptismal vows "We renounce the devil and all his doings and all his beings" as the beginning of this creed, before the line "We believe in God etc." This is mostly due to the influence of the Danish pastor Grundtvig.

=== United Methodist Church ===
The United Methodists in the USA commonly incorporate the Apostles' Creed into their worship services. The version which is most often used is located at No. 881 in the United Methodist Hymnal, one of their most popular hymnals and one with a heritage to brothers John Wesley and Charles Wesley, founders of Methodism. It is notable for omitting the line "he descended into hell", but is otherwise very similar to the Book of Common Prayer version. The 1989 Hymnal has both the traditional version and the 1988 ecumenical version, which includes "he descended to the dead".

The Apostles' Creed as found in The Methodist Hymnal of 1939 also omits the line "he descended..." The Methodist Hymnal of 1966 has the same version of the creed, but with a note at the bottom of the page stating, "Traditional use of this creed includes these words: 'He descended into hell.'"

However, when the Methodist Episcopal Church was organized in the United States in 1784, John Wesley sent the new American Church a Sunday Service which included the phrase "he descended into hell" in the text of the Apostles' Creed.

The United Methodist Hymnal of 1989 also contains (at #882) what it terms the "Ecumenical Version" of this creed which is the ecumenically accepted modern translation of the International Committee on English Texts (1975) as amended by the subsequent successor body, the English Language Liturgical Consultation (1987). This form of the Apostles' Creed can be found incorporated into the Eucharistic and Baptismal Liturgies in the Hymnal and in The United Methodist Book of Worship, and hence it is growing in popularity and use. The word catholic is intentionally left lowercase in the sense that the word catholic applies to the universal and ecumenical Christian church.

I believe in God the Father Almighty,
maker of heaven and earth;

And in Jesus Christ, his only Son, our Lord,
who was conceived by the Holy Spirit,
born of the Virgin Mary,
suffered under Pontius Pilate,
was crucified, died, and was buried;
he descended to the dead.
On the third day he rose again;
he ascended into heaven,
is seated at the right hand of the Father,
and will come again to judge the living and the dead.

I believe in the Holy Spirit,
the holy catholic church,
the communion of saints,
the forgiveness of sins,
the resurrection of the body
and the life everlasting. Amen.

== Musical settings ==
Musical settings of the Symbolum Apostolorum as a motet are rare. English composer Robert Wylkynson (d. ca. 1515) composed a thirteen-voice canon, Jesus autem transiens, included in the Eton Choirbook, which features the text of the Creed. The French composer Le Brung published one Latin setting in 1540, and the Spanish composer Fernando de las Infantas published two in 1578.

Martin Luther wrote the hymn "Wir glauben all an einen Gott" (translated into English as "We all believe in one God") in 1524 as a paraphrase of the Apostles' Creed.

In 1957, William P. Latham wrote "Credo (Metrical Version of the Apostle’s Creed)" in an SATB arrangement suitable for boys' and men's voices.

In 1979 John Michael Talbot, a Third Order Franciscan, composed and recorded "Creed" on his album, The Lord's Supper.

In 1986 Graham Kendrick published the popular "We believe in God the Father", closely based on the Apostles' Creed.

The song "Creed" on Petra's 1990 album Beyond Belief is loosely based on the Apostles' Creed.

GIA Publications published a hymn text in 1991 directly based on the Apostles' Creed, called "I Believe in God Almighty". It has been sung to hymn tunes from Wales, the Netherlands, and Ireland.

Rich Mullins and Beaker also composed a musical setting titled "Creed", released on Mullins' 1993 album A Liturgy, a Legacy, & a Ragamuffin Band. Notably, Mullins' version replaces "one holy catholic church" with "one holy church".

Integrity Music under the Hosanna! Music series, produced a live worship acoustic album in 1993, Be Magnified, which featured Randy Rothwell as worship leader, had an upbeat enthusiastic hymn called "The Apostle’s Creed", written by Randy Rothwell Burbank.

Newsboys released "We Believe" in 2013 on their album Restart. It was nominated for a Billboard Music Award for Top Christian Song.

In 2014 Hillsong released a version of the Apostles' Creed under the title "This I Believe (The Creed)" on their album No Other Name.

Keith & Kristyn Getty released an expression of the Apostles' Creed under the title "We Believe (Apostle's Creed)" on their 2016 album Facing a Task Unfinished.

== See also ==
- Chalcedonian Creed
- One, Holy, Catholic, and Apostolic Church
- Passion of Jesus
- Virgin birth of Jesus
