= Dorner =

Dorner (or Dörner) is a surname. Notable people with the surname include:

- Alfons Dorner (born 1936), German cross-country skier
- August Dorner (1846–1920), German theologian; son of Isaak August Dorner
- Axel Dörner (born 1964), German trumpeter, pianist, and composer
- Cameron Dorner (born 2004), American football player
- Carl H. Dorner (1837–1911), German-born American politician
- Christopher Dorner (1979–2013), American police officer and spree killer
- Dalia Dorner (born 1934), Israeli supreme court judge
- Dietrich Dörner (born 1938), German psychologist and emeritus professor
- Françoise Dorner (born 1949), French actress, screenwriter, novelist, and playwright
- Friedrich Karl Dörner (1911–1992), German archaeologist and epigrapher
- Gus Dorner (1876–1956), American basketball player
- Hans-Jürgen Dörner (1951–2022), German football coach and former player
- Helmut Dörner (1909–1945), German NaziWaffen-SS commander
- Herbert Dörner (1930–1991), German international footballer
- Hermann Dorner (1882–1963), German aviation pioneer
- Iben Dorner (born 1978), Danish actress and voice artist
- Irene Dorner (born ?), American banking executive and lawyer
- Isaak August Dorner (1809–1884), German Lutheran church leader; father of August Dorner
- Johann Conrad Dorner (1810–1866), Austrian painter
- Johann Jakob Dorner (disambiguation), several people
- József Dorner (1808–1873), Hungarian botanist
- Karl-Heinz Dorner (born 1979), Austrian ski jumper
- Katja Dörner (born 1976), German politician
- Mario Dorner (born 1970), Austrian footballer
- Mirko Dorner (1921–2004), German-Hungarian cellist, composer, and painter
- Rainer Dörner (born 1937), German middle-distance runner
- Steve Dorner (born ?), American software engineer

== See also ==
- Doerner
