= Dogmatic theology =

Theology of theoretical official truths

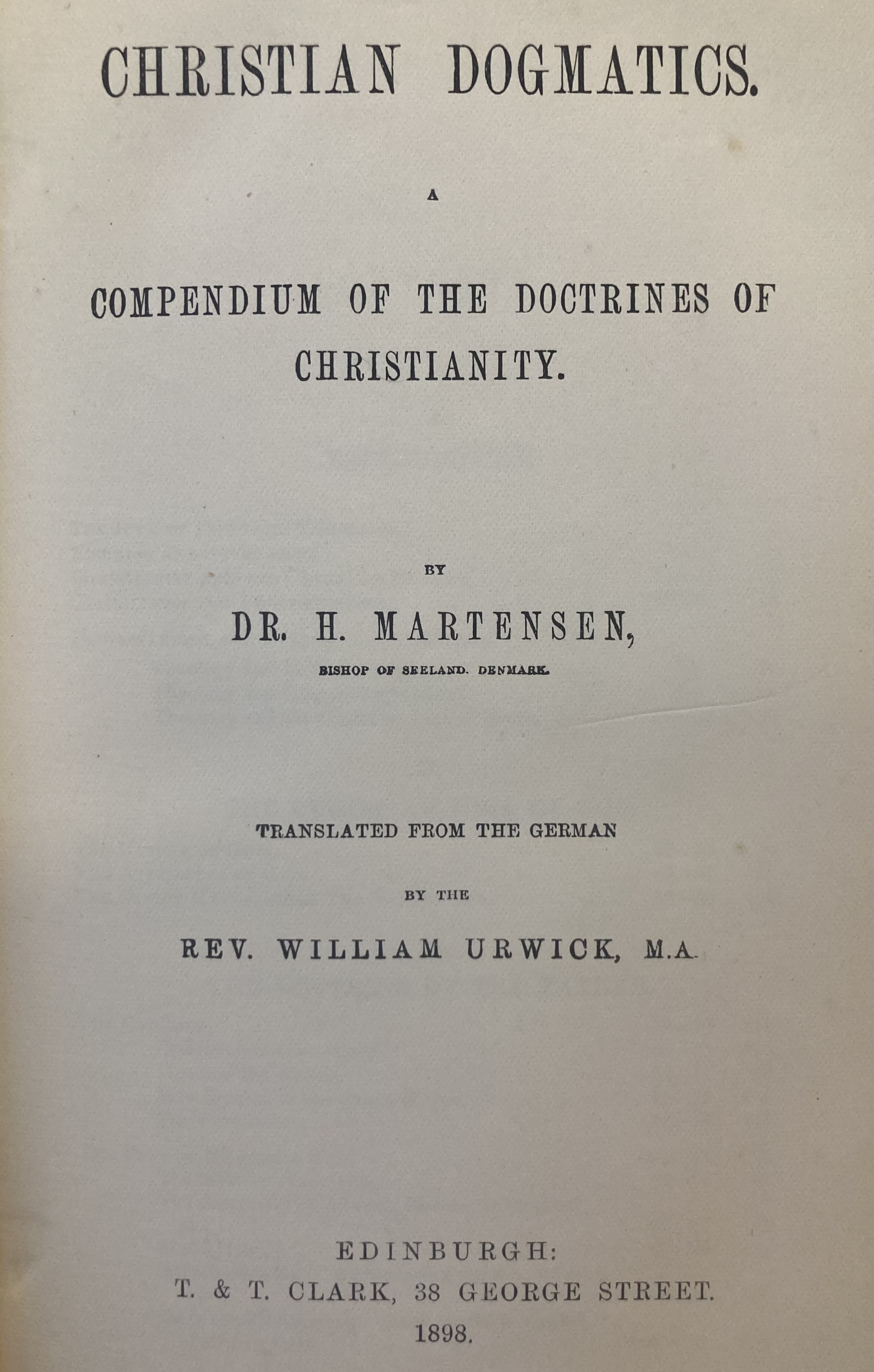
The title page of the English translation of Hans Lassen Martensen's Christian Dogmatics (1898), a part of T&T Clark's Foreign Theological Library series.

Dogmatic theology, also called dogmatics, is the part of theology dealing with the theoretical truths of faith concerning God and God's works, especially the official theology recognized by an organized Church body, such as the Roman Catholic Church, Dutch Reformed Church, etc. Accordingly, "dogmatics is the theological discipline that, on the basis of the biblical witness and against the background of church tradition, thinks through and systematically presents the truth of the Christian faith in its central contents (dogmas), adopting a scientific and critical method and taking into account the contemporary situation."

Joseph Pohle in 1912 wrote:

At times, apologetics or fundamental theology is called "general dogmatic theology," dogmatic theology proper being distinguished from it as "special dogmatic theology." In present-day use, however, apologetics is no longer treated as part of dogmatic theology but has attained the rank of an independent science, being generally regarded as the introduction to and foundation of dogmatic theology.

Dogmatic theology often incorporates theological ethics, the latter being either distributed along with or derived from it.

The term dogmatic theology became more widely used following the Protestant Reformation and was used to designate the articles of faith that the Church had officially formulated. An example of dogmatic theology is the doctrinal statements or dogmas that were formulated by the early church councils who sought to resolve theological problems and to take a stance against a heretical teaching. These creeds or dogmas that came out of the church councils were considered to be authoritative and binding on all Christians because the church officially affirmed them. However, Dogmatic theology as a field is not to be confused with conciliar theology or kerygmatics, the former often retrieving and constructively drawing on the latter. One of the purposes of dogmatic theology is to formulate and communicate doctrine that is considered essential to Christianity and which if denied would constitute heresy, although this is not its sole purpose. More precisely, "The adjective serves the cause of precision and theological differentiation."

== Definition ==
Dogmatic theology or dogmatics has variously been defined as the ecclesial science of theology, or the scientific material ordering of the church's thoughts concerning God and all things in relation to God. This falls within theology's broader claim to be the Queen of the Sciences, a claim developed and popularized by Thomas Aquinas in the Summa Theologiae but found as early as Clement of Alexandria in his 2nd century Stromata. Generally speaking, dogmatic theology emphasizes the importance of propositional truth over experiential, sensory perceptions, although may also integrate such components into its system. As such, as opposed to mere propositional abstraction, dogmatics is an integrative, holistic, and organic science that spans the breadth of ecclesial consciousness about its relationship to God as sub specie Dei: "Rather than reducing theology to a set of propositions or a historical narrative, dogmatics seeks to be a form of wisdom that explores and articulates the mystery of God’s self-revelation in Christ through the Spirit..."

Of dogmatic theology as a science, in his book, Dogmatisk Metode (Dogmatic Method), Hans Ording writes:

It is a recognized rule that the method must follow the substance to be treated, and that within science different methods must be used for the different branches of science, e.g. that one must distinguish between a natural scientific and a historical scientific method ... theology requires its own method, which cannot be easily adopted from other areas of science ... No science is without assumptions, but it shows its scientific ability by correctly inventing and applying the assumptions that are valid for the area to be treated ... Theology has generally demanded recognition as a science, also when it comes to dogmatics.

As such, in his seminal work, Theological Science (1969), T.F. Torrance defines it this way:

Christian dogmatics is the pure science of theology in which, as in every science, we seek to discover the fundamental structure and order in the nature of things and to develop basic forms of thought about them as our understanding is allowed to be controlled by them from beyond our individualism.

=== Examples and Perspectives ===
Neo-orthodox theologian Karl Barth defined dogmatic theology as the scientific exposition of the entire theoretical doctrine concerning God and God's external activity. Describing theology in general as a "scientific" (wissenschaftlich) discipline ("theology has no reason not to call itself a science"), he goes on to describe dogmatics in terms of criteria, falsifiability, authority bases, and a priori versus a posteriori principles. He writes, "Dogmatics is the critical question about dogma, i.e., about the Word of God in Church proclamation, or, concretely, about the agreement of the Church proclamation done and to be done by man with the revelation attested in Holy Scripture." This is similar to earlier definitions arrived at in the nineteenth century by Danish Lutheran theologian Hans Lassen Martensen and Mediating theologian Isaak August Dorner.

A unique approach is found in the dogmatics of Norwegian Lutheran theologian Gisle Johnson, who attempts to construct dogmatics after Kierkegaard as pertaining primarily to the essence of faith (Troens Væsen). According to Johnson, dogmatics is "the systematic understanding of the truth content of the Christian faith," which "develop out of the essence of faith." For Johnson, there is an "organic unity" to dogmatics that develops "from one central, basic truth," i.e. the essence of faith and its primary referent, God, and thus he considers it "scientific" (videnskabelige).

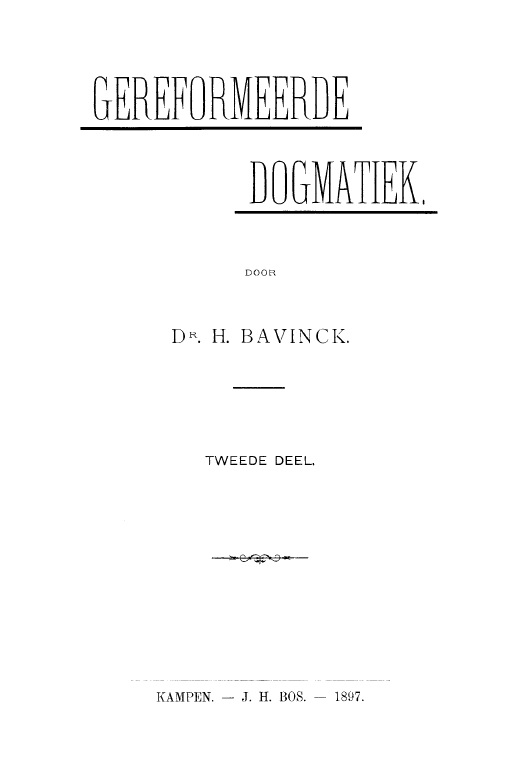
Title page of the original Dutch version of Herman Bavinck's Gereformeerde Dogmatiek, vol. 2.

Within the Dutch Reformed tradition of Neo-Calvinism, Herman Bavinck devoted four volumes to dogmatic theology. In volume one of Reformed Dogmatics, Bavinck considers variously definitions of dogmatic theology, arriving ultimately at a definition of it as an organic science, one that has "an organic unity" and considers "three factors: Scripture, church, and Christian consciousness." According to Bavinck, dogmatics includes kerygmatics, or the study of the church's creeds and confessions, and thus must also consider the material ordering of its thoughts in relation to God.

Within 21st century theology, Anglican theologian John Webster has worked considerably with the concept of dogmatic theology within his project of reclaiming a "theological theology," considering it as an exercise in the ordering of the Church's doctrine in relation to God and Scripture: a scientific exercise in logical location based on assumed principles. Although in one place Webster writes in consistency with Barth, "Christian dogmatics has a double theme: God in himself and the outer works of God, theology proper and economy," he will elsewhere specify that:

Dogmatics has a twofold task: an analytic-expository task, in which it attempts orderly conceptual representation of the content of the Christian gospel as it is laid out in the scriptural witness; and a polemical-apologetical task in which it explores the justification and value of Christian truth-claims.

He will likewise refer to it variously as "a positive science," "ecclesiastical science," and "a critical science."

The Roman Catholic Congregation for the Doctrine of the Faith is charged with ensuring fidelity to Catholic teaching regarding theology and doctrine among all members of the Church – especially in disputes or unsolved issues involving theology and the faith, and in dealing with individuals (especially clergy, religious, and catechists, where orthodoxy is a special concern, but also laypeople) whose teachings or statements have been judged erroneous at the local level. In 1989, the Congregation's International Theological Commission prepared a document on doctrinal theology called "The Interpretation of Dogma." This happened when Pope Benedict XVI was Prefect of the Congregation and thus President of the commission.

=== Distinction from Systematic Theology ===
There is some debate as to whether or not dogmatic theology is distinct from systematic theology as a discipline. Much literature seems to implement the terms synonymously, e.g. John Webster in his "Principles of Systematic Theology."

Gisle Johnson's work Grundrids af den Systematiske Theologi (Foundations of Systematic Theology) is self-described as both a systematic theology and a dogmatic theology containing separate sections on faith and dogmatics. Yet Johnson considers dogmatics to be contained within, yet distinct from, systematics, an ordering of truth from faith commitments. According to Johnson, dogmatics "unfolds with inner necessity step-by-step from a central fundamental truth and thus appears completely through it as borne and controlled by a certain, immediately given Principle in the very Essence of Faith."

Herman Bavinck, likewise, seems to see the terms as generally synonymous, although generally considering dogmatics to be a broader science, implementing kerygmatics, or the study of the church's creeds and confessions. Bavinck will also refer to dogmatics in organic terms, considering it an outgrowth and logical material ordering of what is modeled in Scripture.

John Webster seems to hint at a similar distinction, often referring to 'dogmatic order,' and some distinction seems assumed when he writes that "prolegomena to systematic theology are an extension and application of the content of Christian dogmatics (Trinity, creation, fall, reconciliation, regeneration, and the rest), not a ‘pre-dogmatic’ inquiry into its possibility." Likewise, in the same article, Webster will warn against overly segregated approaches to systematic theology that consider it as merely asynchronously reorganizing biblical content.

In its broadest distinction, John Webster specifies in the Oxford Handbook of Systematic Theology:

'Dogmatics' is often, though not exclusively, used to denote the rather more determinate study and exposition of dogma, that is, of authorized church teaching ... 'Systematic theology', on the other hand, is broader in compass than dogmatics, if the latter is taken to be concerned with teaching which has acquired ecclesial definition and approval, since systematic theology occupies itself more generally with Christian claims about reality.

== Etymology ==
Primarily, the word "dogma" originates from the Greek, δόγματα, used in Acts 16:4 and 17:7 and finding early referents in the Septuagint of Esther 3:9 and Daniel 2:13. Within scholastic theology, the word took on the connotation of "a doctrine absolutely necessary to the faith," i.e. a binding ecclesiastical decree.

The term "dogmatic theology" (theologica dogmatica) is thought to have first appeared as differentiated from theologia moralis by G. Calixtus in his 1634 Epitome theologiae moralis, and appears first as a title of a book in 1659 by L.F. Reinhard (Synopsis theologia Christianae dogmaticae). A. M. Fairbairn holds that it was the fame of Petau which gave currency to the new coinage "dogmatic theology"; and though the same or related phrases had been used repeatedly by writers of less influence since Reinhard and Andreas Essenius, F. Buddeus (Institutiones theol. dogmat., 1723; Compendium, 1728) is held to have given the expression its supremacy. Noel Alexandre, the Gallican theologian, possibly introduced it in the Roman Catholic Church (1693; Theologia dogmatica et moralis).

Both Roman Catholic and Protestant authorities agree that the expression was connected with the new habit of distinguishing dogmatics from Christian ethics or moral theology, e.g. Calixtus, though earlier usages conflate terms, e.g. L.F. Reinhard. The exact relationship varies in 19th century dogmatics: for example, Isaak Dorner considers ethics to be dependent on dogmatics, although separate; Hans Lassen Martensen considers them separate but interdependent, dogmatics being ethical and ethics being dogmatic; and Gisle Johnson considers ethics to be an organic outgrowth of faith and dogmatics. In another direction dogmas and dogmatic theology were also contrasted with truths of reason and natural theology.

== See also ==
- Kerygma – Greek word used in the New Testament for "proclamation"
- Systematic theology – Orderly, rational, and coherent account of the doctrines of the Christian faith
- Catholic dogmatic theology
- Christian apologetics – Branch of Christian theology that defends Christianity against objections
- Christian theology – Study of Christian belief and practice
- Constructive theology
- Feminist theology
- Liberal Christianity – Emphasis on reason and experience over doctrinal authority
- Liberation theology – Christian theological approach emphasizing the liberation of the oppressed
- Process theology – Type of theology
- Queer theology – Theological method related to queer theory
