= Doerner =

Doerner is a surname. Notable people with the surname include:

- Charles Doerner, Luxembourgish chess master
- Christine Doerner, Luxembourgish politician
- Cynthia Doerner, Australian tennis player and coach
- Darrick Doerner, American surfer
- Gus Doerner, American basketball player
- Luke Doerner, Australian field hockey player
- Max Doerner (artist), German artist
- Max Doerner (rugby league), Australian rugby player
- William Doerner, American professor

== See also ==
- Doerner Institute, research institute in Munich, Germany
- Dorner or Dörner, related surname
