= Gisle Johnson =

Norwegian theologian and educator

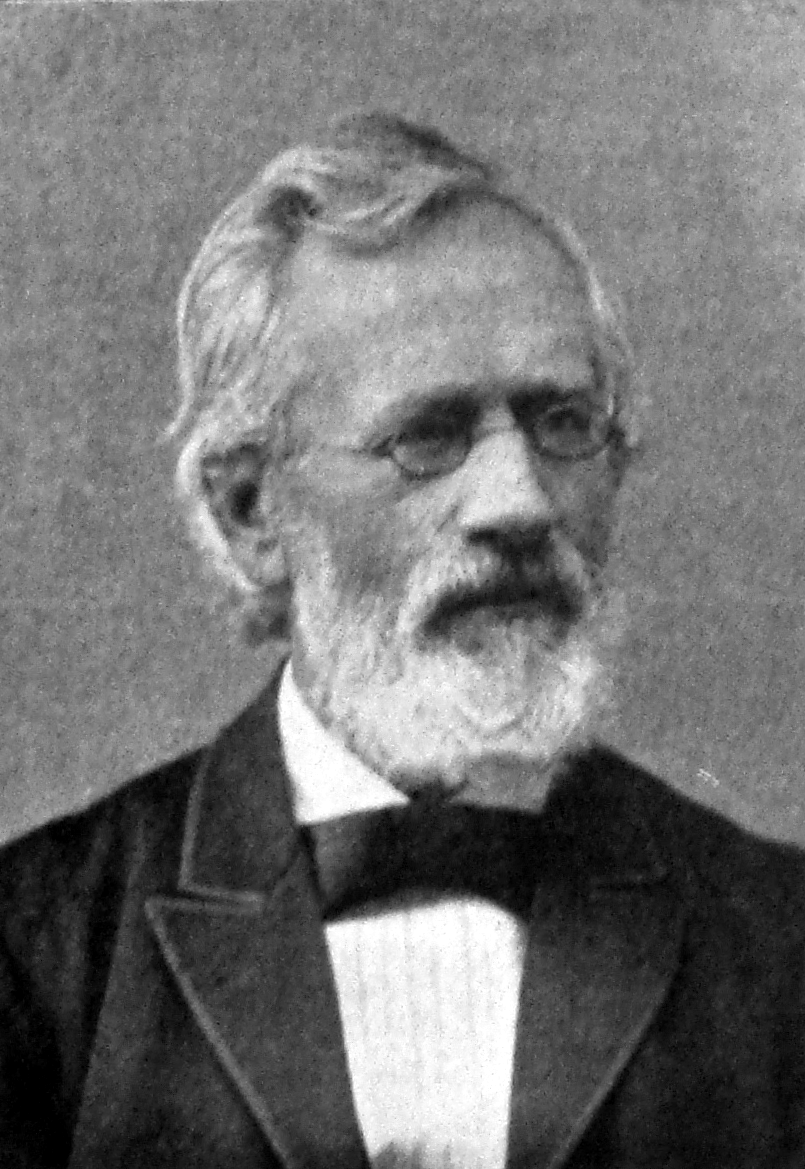
- Gisle Johnson (1889)
- Born: September 10, 1822; Halden, Østfold, Norway
- Died: July 17, 1894 (aged 71); Nøtterø Municipality, Vestfold, Norway
- Education: University of Christiania
- Occupations: Lutheran Theologian and Revivalist
- Theological work
- Tradition or movement: Lutheran orthodoxy Erlangen Theology Johnsonian Revivals
- Notable ideas: Lay Preaching Dogmatics of Faith

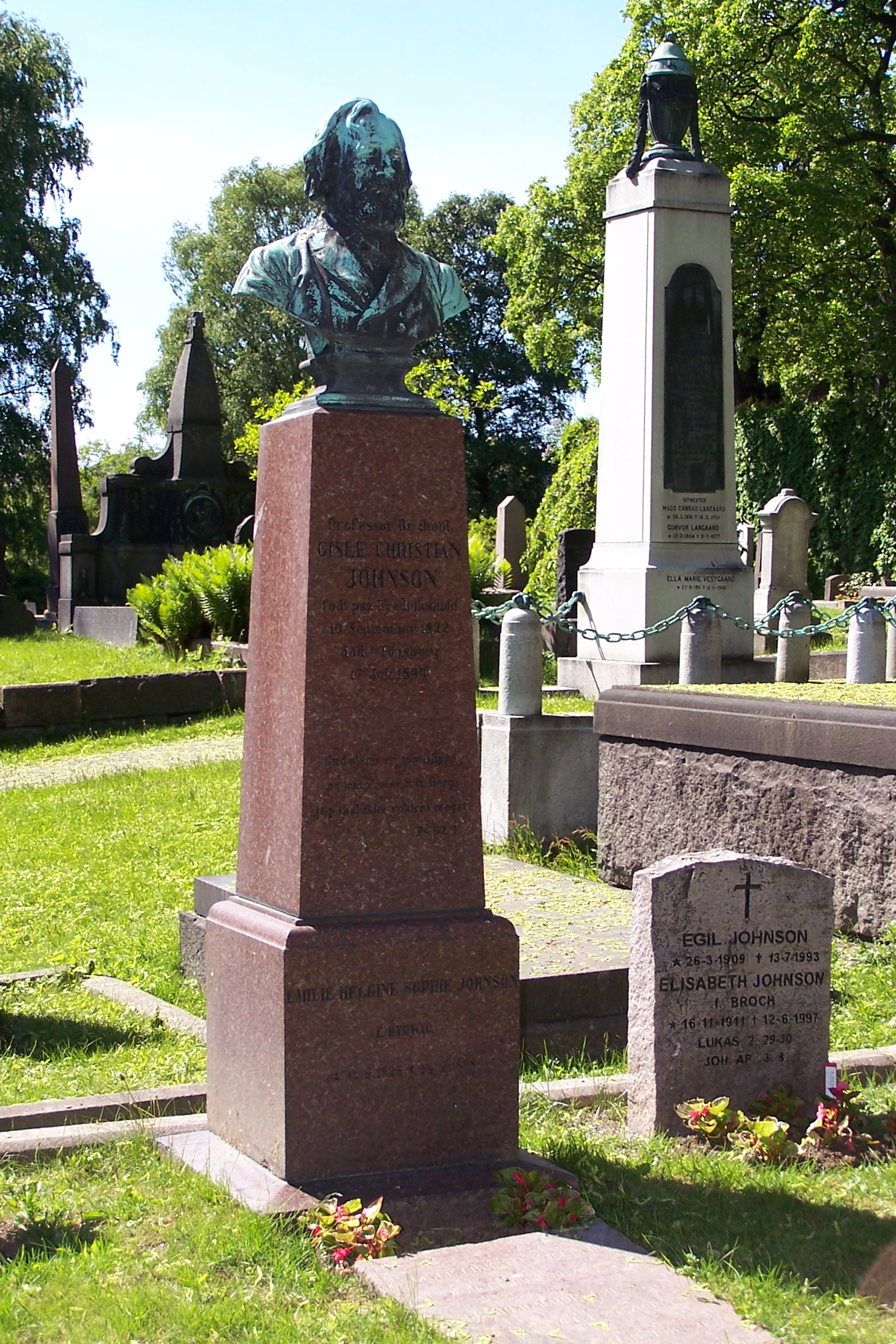
Gisle Christian Johnson monument at Vår Frelsers gravlund, Oslo

Gisle Christian Johnson (10 September 1822 – 17 July 1894) was a leading 19th-century Norwegian theologian, revivalist, and educator.

== Biography ==
Gisle Christian Johnson was born in Fredrikshald in Østfold, Norway. He grew up at Kristiansand in Lister og Mandal county. He was a son of engineer and architect Georg Daniel Barth Johnson (1794–1872). His grandfather, also Gisle Johnson (1758-1829), was an Icelandic minister who immigrated to Norway after theological training in Copenhagen. He studied theology at the University of Christiania (now University of Oslo) and graduated in 1845. In 1849 he became a lecturer at the University of Christiania, and in 1860 a professor, first in systematic theology and Dogmatic theology and from 1875 in church history.

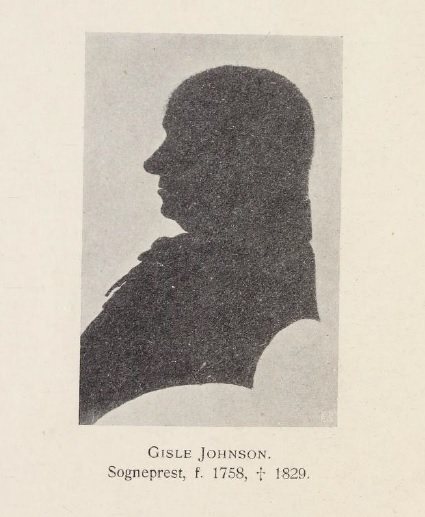
A silhouette of the elder Gisle Johnson (1758-1828), preserved in Georg Johnson's book Familien Johnson (1908).

=== Early life and education ===
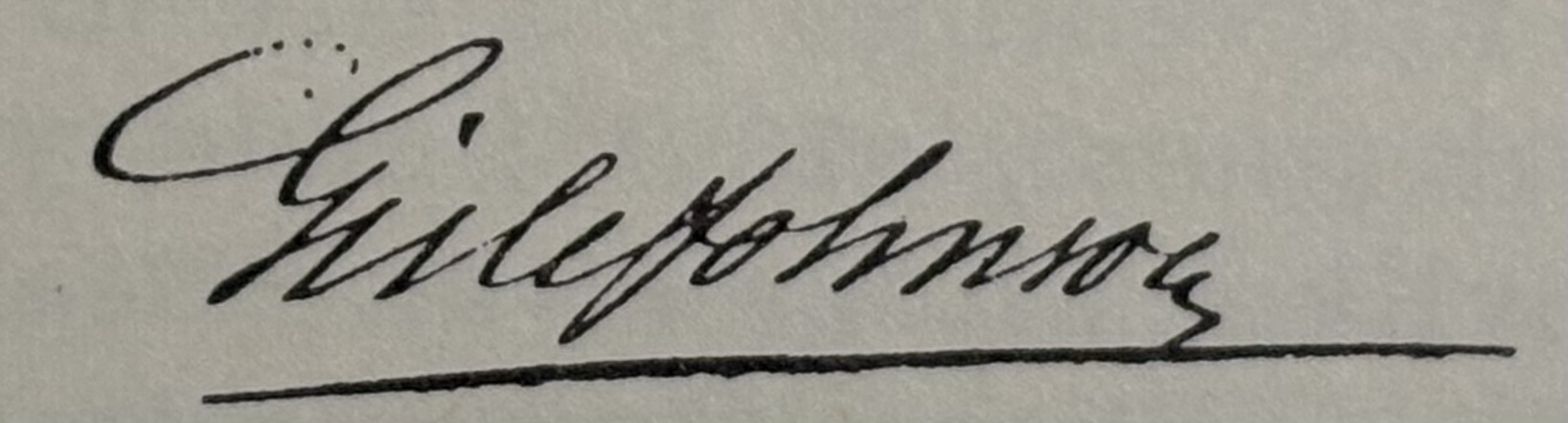
Gisle Johnson's Signature

Raised in a Pietist Lutheran family, Johnson was deeply influenced from an early age by the revivalistic preaching of Hans Nielsen Hauge (1771–1824) via a Haugean, Ole Pedersen Noe, who would influence Johnson to pursue vocational ministry. Likewise, Christian Thistedal (1813–1876), a teacher at the Kristiansand Latin School, was also a profound theological influence on Johnson, educating him in the more formal aspects of theology including Greek, Hebrew, and Syriac prior to his entrance to the university, and acquainting him with Lutheran dogmaticians and confessionalism. During his time in the university Gisle excelled in his studies, reading well beyond his required course of study and digesting literature from Kierkegaard, Bengel, Gesenius, Vitringa, and others. In 1845 Johnson passed his university exit examinations "with distinctions," and was soon after offered the post of lecturer of theology, which he turned down in favor of a scholarship to study theology abroad in Germany beginning in 1846. There, he became profoundly influenced by the Erlangen School of Theology, which appealed to his own theological sensibilities by its appeal to Scripture, Confessions, and religious experience as its threefold religious principles. He later reflected,

This University offered me such a rich assortment (samling) of all that could possibly have been of interest and meaning for my studies, that ... if I had been able to spend another half year abroad would in a moment have thought of nothing other than Erlangen.

=== Career and accomplishments ===
When Johnson returned to Norway, he brought with him an eclectic mix of German theology, pietism, and Lutheran Confessionalism, which emerges in his most significant theological work, Grundrids af den Systematisk Theologi, a work which incorporates a Kierkegaardian-style prolegomena on faith in its three stages, followed by a dogmatic account stemming from realities of justification and regeneration. It was this focus on faith and the new birth that would prove to be a particular element of emphasis in Johnson's preaching ministry, which focused on the need for God's grace in the heart, a ministry which appealed to laypeople and ministers alike and which became known as the Johnsonian Revivals.

In 1855, he founded the Christiania Inner Mission Society (Christiania Indremissionsforening), in 1863 the Lutheran Church Official Journal (Luthersk Kirketidende) and in 1867 the Norwegian Luther Foundation (Den norske Lutherstiftelse). In 1858 he established, together with Carl Paul Caspari, an annual publication entitled Theologisk Tidskrift for den evangelisk-lutherske Kirke i Norge which he edited until 1891. Religiously he followed strict Confessional Lutheranism. During the Johnsonian revivals, which went across Norway during the 1850s, he reflected the pietistic and ecclesial tradition of Hans Nielsen Hauge. Johnson emphasized a theology that was both based on the experience of faith and grounded in Lutheran orthodoxy.

He was a member of the Royal Norwegian Society of Sciences and Letters from 1858. He was appointed a Knight in the Order of St. Olav in 1866 and made a Commander 1st class in 1882. In 1879, he was conferred an honorary doctorate by the University of Copenhagen. He died during 1894 in Nøtterø Municipality in Vestfold county, Norway. Both Gisle Johnsons plass in the district of Grünerløkka in Oslo and Gisle Johnsons gate in Trondheim were named in his honor.

=== Decline and death ===
Despite his influence, accomplishments, and charisma, the last several decades of Gisle's life are often noted as being characterized by decline and withdrawal. Skarsten evaluates that,

As a revival preacher, Gisle Johnson's activity came to an end in the late 'sixties. He had never been strong physically, and he found that he just could not stand up under the constant strain of lecturing and preaching.

Of his death, Nostbakken recounts,

On July 17, 1894 he died in his sleep. During his last days he spoke of the nearness of his salvation in Christ. On the day before his death when questioned as to whether or not he held firmly to reconciliation in Christ, he answered, "Ja visselig" (yes, certainly). Those were his last words.

=== Personality ===
Gisle Johnsons' personality is depicted as reserved and yet conscience-driven. Ousland writes of his earliest youth, that "Gisle had a sensitive mind as a child, and he retained this character trait throughout his life. He could easily be overwhelmed by change, as happened several times during serious events in his life." Likewise, Nostbakken considers that Gisle's reticence to address certain issues and his recension from the public eye in later years may have been due to this naturally-withdrawn character: "He was timid and cautious. He had a natural tendency to rely on the authority of others."

Nonetheless, Gisle's passion for theological experience lent his preaching and lecturing career a great deal of charisma. J.C. Heuch had recorded that "he was so gripped by the forcefulness and the interest of Johnson's lectures that on more than one occasion he caught himself sitting with mouth open and pen fallen on the desk completely fascinated by the address." In fact, with regards to his preaching ministry and revivalism, he was likened to Jonathan Edwards:

People poured into the meeting place and sat spellbound while he spoke, often for as long as two hours. His words seemed to grip his hearers with an almost mystic power. He was not an emotional preacher, but he was a strong preacher of repentance. One is reminded of the awakening under Jonathan Edwards when one reads about Johnson that when in a thin and quiet voice he read the words 'There is no peace for the ungodly, saith my God' a visible tremor ran through the audience.

As such, Nostbakken evaluates, "Johnson, as a person was quiet and shy, his preaching was quiet and restrained, but its effect was to cause a religious awakening, to sweep through country." In his personal life, it is notable that Johnson is depicted as being personally generous and gracious with students. Skarsten recounts that:

Every other Saturday evening the theological students had a standing invitation to come to the home of Gisle Johnson. These gatherings were not just theological 'bull sessions' with the professor. From Gisle Johnson's side, they were an attempt to lead the students into a personal type of Christianity and a living faith. The sessions were always informal, full of fun and laughter. Toward the close of the evening Gisle Johnson would usually lead in devotions.

Likewise, in reflecting on the life of his father, Jonathan Johnson recounted several stories in reflecting on Gisle's sense of humor.

== Theology ==
Gisle's theology was contained over the course of three volumes, a compact consideration of faith and dogma in his Grundrids af Den Systematiske Theology (1878), along with lectures on ethics (Forelæsninger over den kristelige Ethik, 1898) and lectures on dogmatic history (Forelæsninger over dogmehistorien 1898). Together, the Grundrids (containing Pistiks and Dogmatiks) and the kristelige Ethiks comprise three volumes of what Gisle envisioned to be a full dogmatic treatment of the Christian faith; in the introduction to his Grundrids he reasons,

From the three basic connections in which it is objectively perceived by the conscious mind, systematic theology is divided into three parts. These may be called Christian Pistics or the teaching concerning the nature of faith, Christian dogmatics, or the teaching concerning the truth-content of faith, and Christian ethics, or the teaching concerning the life of faith. Systematic theology finds its total content in these three disciplines... (s. 1)

A potential fourth element of Johnson's thought is the Forelæsninger over dogmehistorien, or Lectures on Dogmatic History, also published posthumously, which will be discussed below.

Gisle's method is what Kaasa correctly terms "regressive," beginning with faith and moving toward concrete theological realities. As such, it represents a different ordo cognitio (order of knowing) than typical dogmatic treatments of the period, largely related to the influence of Kierkegaard and Erlangen theology on his thinking. Notably, Gisle's dogmatics implement an organic motif, where faith, the church, etc. are seen as organic realities, and as such it would not be unfair to categorize him as organicist in his ontology.

=== Outlines of Systematic Theology ===
The title, Grundrids, can variously be translated "groundworks," "outlines," "essentials," "elements," or "foundations," and was used by other Scandinavian theologians to denote introductory sketches to the field of dogmatics, e.g. Thomas Ralston's 1851 Grundrids til Theologien (Danish). Johnson's work is thus not meant to be a comprehensive dogmatic theology, but an introductory framework for the task of confessional theology. The subtitle, til Brug ved Forelæsninger udgivet af Gisle Johnson ("for use in lectures as presented by Gisle Johnson"), also indicates the strong association between the work and Gisle's lecturing career and points to their nature as introductory materials, or 'essentials,' for students of divinity. Nonetheless, an 1878 Swedish version of Johnson's Lectures on Systematic Theology (Föreläsningar öfver Systematiska Theologien) have preserved a greater extent of his content using notes dating prior to 1868, and the volume details an impressive and comprehensive dogmatic of the history, faith, and systematic content of Christianity.

==== Pistiks ====
The Grundrids bear the marks of a sophisticated ordered dogmatic. In the Pistiks Gisle intentionally begins with what amounts to a prolegomena to theology based on the presuppositions of human faith: "As Christian Pistics, it is the task of systematic theology to understand that unique form of man' s personal being that is known as Christian faith, as something true and necessary for mankind." Here Gisle mirrors Kierkegaard by outlining his own the three stages of faith: the Egotistic, Legalist, and Christian (or Ethical) Faith, and moved toward traditional Lutheran categories of salvation by grace alone through faith alone. As such, although faith is a natural state of humanity, saving, Christian faith is both continuous and discontinuous with the prior stages of faith:

The relationship between legalistic faith and Christian faith excludes any possibility of immediate transfer from one to the other. True, Christian faith finds its definite basis in legalistic faith. That which man through the mediation of the Law has understood about its content, about God as its Author and Preserver, and about himself as its transgressor, becomes also for the Christian unshakeable truth. Nevertheless, there is one point at which Christian faith becomes diametrically opposed to legalistic faith. While man in the latter sees himself to be the object of God's wrath because of his sin, in the former he is convinced in spite of his sin that he is the object of God's grace. (s. 53)

Significantly, although this initial section on Pistiks is highly experiential, it is also intended to establish a definite ontological basis for the construction of his dogmatic in the second part. In this sense, Kaasa's designation of Gisle's dogmatic method is incorrect when he considers him as beginning with "subjective consciousness" akin to Schleiermacher. Instead, Gisle's method is self-consciously "scientific" (vitenskapelige) and his concern is to ascertain the essence (being or ontology) of faith (Troens Væsen, s. 7), the development of which he holds is organically related to the individuals and proceeds by way of existential conflict. As such, although other theologians had attempted a more traditional exploration of faith as a separate locus (e.g. Isaak Dorner), Gisle represents a unique blend of emphasis on ontology and being (Væsen) and existential elements (using the Danish Existens), representing a theology of both being and becoming. It is unsurprising, then, to see a focus on the organic qualities of faith toward the beginning of his Forelæsninger over den Kristelige Ethics, defining faith as Trosliv, or "living faith" / "Faith-life," and likening it to a blossoming tree.

==== Dogmatiks ====
In the beginning of the Dogmatik portion, then, it is unsurprising to see that Gisle extends this scientific and ordered consideration of faith to the realm of theological propositions, which he believes to be the necessary objective relation to the subjective essence of faith (s. 61). Here, Gisle's order of theology is inductive, once again worked out from the order of faithful knowing, beginning with soteriology, moving onto anthropology, and ending with theology proper, which he sees as the pinnacle of faith's exploration (s. 61). Dogmatically, and in consistency with classical Lutheran commitments, Gisle sees justification as a unique intersection and basis for the whole of Christian religion: "The doctrine of justification is not only one factor besides the others in the system of dogmatics, it is the central, basic doctrine which in itself essentially includes the whole system, and from which every other factor is necessarily developed" (s. 61). As such, it is unsurprising that he immediately segues from faith to his discussion of justification. Gisle holds justification to be a once-for-all objective and forensic reality of double-imputation: "justification is an act of judgement on God's part, whereby He in His heart looks upon, considers, recognises and declares the sinner, who in himself is unrighteous, to be righteous," a work which "finds its source in the grace of God" (s. 64). Gisle then extends a family analogy to justification by way of adoption, lending it a personal quality and defining it from Romans 5:19 as "the objective restoration of his fellowship with God, previously disturbed by sin. The justified sinner is thus objectively reconciled to God and reunited with Him" (s. 64).

===== Rebirth and renewal =====
From justification Gisle then turns to regeneration and the reality of this new life of faith. This he sees as consisting in two parts: the creative initiation of the new life principle (nyt Livsprincip) in the heart of the sinner, formally regeneration (Gjenfødelse, lit. 'rebirth'), and the ongoing sanctifying process, which he designates renewal (Fornyelse). The causal realities of this process he wishes to allocate properly to the Holy Spirit, with keen attention to the united work of the Trinity:

And just as this life is a spiritual life, so also is its communication first and foremost a work of the Spirit of God, depending on God’s gift of his Spirit to the sinner. By taking up residence in heart of the sinner and uniting with his spirit, but sinking down into the inner, central point of the sinner’s personal existence as living, inviolable seed, the Holy Spirit makes him a new spiritual man. But this whole activity that brings God’s Spirit and life appears at this point to the believer’s consciousness as mediated through Christ (s. 73).

He then goes on to define this rebirth as

...[T]hat gracious act of God whereby He by His Spirit creates faith in Christ in the sinner' s heart, and, in the same moment in which He thus has opened it for His gift of grace, also in the Spirit, takes up residence in the heart and bestows upon it of the fulness of His life. Regeneration thus becomes a union of two factors, of which the one (the gift of faith) is the necessary prerequisite for justification, and the other (the gift of the Holy Spirit) its necessary sequel.

As such, Gisle's theology of faith and regeneration carefully balances both subjective and objective realities, with obvious Pietistic and revivalist qualities. Yet Gisle's ecclesiology extends his considerations of this new life principle of faith to the social and corporate level, an extension of his "organic" view of faith:

As Christ receives individual sinners into life fellowship with Himself, He thereby at the same time places them in a characteristic organic relationship with each other, which we call the "communion of the saints." In so doing He brings them together out of the world into a new human society, and thereby makes them members of a spiritual body of which He is the head: the organic, living life-communicating central point, controlling all things and directing all things (s. 86).

Sticking close to classical theological categories, Gisle goes on to state that the church is "both an invisible and visible fellowship," and "essentially a holy one," "the only one of its kind, and therefore also universal," citing the Apostolic and Nicene Creeds (ss. 87–88).

Such a new and organic society finds its manifestation in the person of Christ the Mediator, which is Gisle's grounds for considering the centrality of the work and person of Christ, following the traditional munus triplex of Christ as prophet, priest, and king. It is here that Gisle will also consider biblical inspiration and authority, sacraments, and church offices, representative of Lutheran Christocentrism.

===== View of Scripture =====
With regards to Gisle's doctrine of Scripture, Nostbakken has asserted that Gisle held to a salvific or functional, but not formal or material, view of biblical authority. Yet Gisle speaks directly about the "purity" of Scripture, that "it can truly become the unshakeable foundation for the Church's faith, the unceasing source and infallible basic norm for its realisation of faith and proclamation of truth" (Grundrids, s. 114). Gisle goes on to speak of Scripture's

ability not only to effect the saving activity of God's Word, but also to correct the ecclesiastical proclamation of the Word and purity of those elements of human error which could become mixed into it. In this way, the Church believes itself to have a word which is in full possession not only of the power of God's Word to bring grace, work faith, enlighten and quicken, but also of the unique authority and perfection of the Word of God. It sees in the Word of Scripture the only absolutely pure source of truth: the generative principle for all that it otherwise, can possess of the "Word of God" - the basic source for all Christian understanding and the foundation for all Christian faith. Indeed, as the pure source of truth, this Word essentially also is the unshakeable and infallible rule, norm and touchstone for all Christian understanding and proclamation of truth, and, as the sure foundation of the Church's faith, essentially also the invariable norm for its faith" (Grundrids, s. 115).

Here, in a large footnote, Gisle cites classic prooftexts for the infallibility of Scripture (e.g. 2 Timothy 3:16 & 2 Pt. 1:21) along with Lutheran Confessional material (Form. Cone., S.D., Article II, 14. Article XI, 12; Apol., Pref., IX; Article II, 108; Augsb. Conf., Article XXVIII, 49). He goes on to state that, "Its material perfection consists in the fact that it contains an absolutely faithful and trustworthy reproduction of Christ's Word which is at once absolutely complete and absolutely pure," and describes its perspicuity as

the formal perfection of Scripture belongs in part its organic unity in the inner continuity and harmonic agreement between all its various parts. To this perfection belongs in part also a clarity which certainly does net exclude all obscurity, but nevertheless makes it possible not only for the Church as a whole, but also for each individual who possesses the necessary natural and spiritual subjective prerequisites, to find satisfaction in it for his need for an inspired Word from God (s. 115).

It is hard, then, to conclude with Nostbakken that Gisle held to only a salvific view of Scripture. On the contrary, the "material perfection" and "formal perfection" of Scripture is viewed as significant for the organic growth of the church's confession on the one hand and the certainty of the believer's faith on the other.

===== Ecclesiology =====
Gisle's ecclesiology is eccentric and dispersed between two separate loci, initially following the doctrine of regeneration (ss. 86-89), and later taken up again under the topic of Christ as Mediator and thus head of the church (ss. 124-126). Gisle believes the church to be an organic reality, a move he implements to overcome dualisms between visible and invisible church paradigms: "The community of believers is a spiritual organism, a living unity of individuals whose different spiritual gifts give them different positions in the organism as a whole, and different inward calls to work in its service" (s. 125). The church is thus "both an invisible and visible fellowship," where the latter contains the former. For Gisle, then, the doctrine of the church as organism bears an organic relationship to the organic development of true faith, itself related to the work of the Trinity. As such, although Kaasa is correct in observing Gisle's structuring of ecclesiology to be "clumsy" and "puzzling," he is also correct in observing that this tracks with his broader method of considering subjective concepts of faith and the individual first and objective concepts second. As such, Johnson's adoption of the invisible/visible, militant/triumphant church paradigm in relation to true faith and conversion is both Lutheran and keenly pietistic, focusing on true spiritual attributes and qualities of the church as they manifest the kingship of Christ in newness of life:

Since it is unable to know the hearts of men, the Church in its visible appearance as a community of Christian confession will never be able to avoid receiving and including as members those who only outwardly have followed the call of grace, confessing what they do not believe, and thus not truly members of it ... While the Church inwardly, in its invisible reality, is and remains a fellowship of the regenerated, it is able in its visible reality to present a picture of a mixed assembly of regenerated and unregenerated ... To distinguish in this way between the Church properly and improperly understood, does not mean that there are two Churches. Rather, it is only to say that the one Church, the assembly of believers, in visible reality always appears in the inadequate form of a confessional community in which its true members are mingled with such as in reality do not belong to it (s. 89).

===== Theology proper and cosmology =====
Structurally, it is interesting that Gisle returns to a consideration of faith prior to his final discussion of theology proper. According to Gisle, this is because of the radical change that Christian faith undergoes from its prior legalist state (s. 147). God is conceived of, from the perspective of the Christian faith, as a God of grace, and this leads Gisle to recount God's historical dealings with his people, including a consideration of Israel, the covenants, and the historical transmission of Scripture (s. 152). Here Gisle's discussion turns cosmic, considering the telos of God's economy and the restoration of all things:

The order of grace is different from the order of nature. The restoration of the original world order disturbed by sin, which is the goal of God's grace, cannot be the result of a divine activity that limits itself to the preservation and continuation of the natural forces and laws once established in the world. It necessarily requires a new divine creation, God's intervention in the existing world (s. 154).

As such, God's grace properly conceived does not supersede creation, but restores it:

This divine intervention in the order of nature can only bring with it a disturbing influence, in so far as it already previously has been disturbed by the corrupting influence of sin. Since the natural order is a work of God, it must rather be said to be predisposed for the supernatural, miraculous activity of His restoring grace (s. 154).

Finally, for Gisle, the entirety of the self-revelation of God's grace in history is directed toward the manifestation of his glory: "God's plan for the world, on the other hand, is a product of His absolute freedom and an expression of His absolute glory. Its goal is to reveal this glory in the world and its voluntary or involuntary recognition by the world - in salvation or perdition," going on to describe "the development of the world to its goal" as "the revelation of His glory" (s. 155). Gisle ends his Dogmatic with a discussion of the Trinity, which he believes to be the pinnacle of the revelation of the economy of God in relation to the Christian faith. Here he distinguishes between the salvific Trinity and the Trinity of the Cosmos, the latter of which being deduced from causality (s. 158). Even here Gisle extends his organic concepts of being and life to the work of the Trinity:

Here, too, the Holy Spirit appears as the 'Spirit of life.' He is the principle of Life, who proceeds from the Father and the Son, enters the world and is immediately present and active in it. The Trinity of God, as revealed in the plan of salvation, finds its necessary basis and prerequisite in this Trinity revealed in the cosmos. The Son appears in the stewardship of salvation as the one Mediator between God and man, precisely because in God's causal relationship to the world He has from the beginning been in the position of Mediator between God and the world. In the same way, the Spirit appears in the former as the indwelling principle of the new life in the hearts of believers precisely because in the latter He has from the beginning been the inherent principle of life in the world" (s. 158).

Although reserved for the end of the work, Gisle's doctrine of the Trinity thus stands as an apex of his dogmatic, wherein the prior elements of his faith-system converge. This is the highest mystery of faith, and as such,

We can also go no further. It is not possible for us to come to any living picture of God's triune essence, as long as we walk in faith. To that extent it will thus always remain for the believer an impenetrable mystery, an enigma of the faith which can only be fully revealed when believing itself becomes beholding (s. 159).

=== Lectures on Christian Ethics ===
Gisle's Forelæsninger over den kristelige Ethik, intended originally as the final installment of his broader dogmatic treatment but published posthumously, begins by continuing his own consideration of faith as a scientific theological endeavor:

Christian ethics we call ‘systematic theology,’ insofar as it appears as the systematic recognition of the Christian life of faith or of faith as a principle for a new moral life. It is the essential other side of the Christian faith, which here becomes the object of consideration, the side, after which it shows itself to be active in life, intervenes in the life of will as a controlling and determining power (p. 1).

As such, ethics is a product of both Pistiks and Dogmatics: "The Task of Ethics thus becomes, more precisely, that of recognizing the Christian Faith-Life, as it emerges with inner necessity from the Essence of Faith in the specifically expressed Form, in which this is presented to us in both of the prior main parts of the Systematic Theology" (p. 3). Ethics thus proceeds as a principled expansion of the new life of faith afforded by the Holy Spirit, his "Faithlife" (Trosliv), which he outlines in three parts: "1) according to its principle, 2) according to its development or activity and 3) according to its purpose" (p. 5). Using agricultural language, Gisle describes the ethical Faithlife as growing and blossoming like a sprout, also moving into a family analogy by way of comparison between a child and father. The Christian faith "manifests itself through love," and as such, "The believer's love for God is essentially the love of the child of God for his heavenly Father in Christ, grateful love in return for the God of love, gratitude to God for His grace revealed in Christ and accepted in faith" (pp. 5–6). The virtue-principle of the Faithlife is what Gisle designates "Faithlove" (Troskjærlighed), which he feels bears a dispositional relationship to the will; in a somewhat dense passage, he reflects,

The Christian Faithlove can thus be said to be the principle for the believer's voluntary life in a double meaning, 1) insofar as the immediate feeling of desire for God that moves the will is the determining motive of the relevant voluntary life, its motive, but secondly 2) also insofar as it determines the basic direction of the will itself from this feeling is a peculiar new Volitional-life in its real Beginning, a positive Life Force, which out of itself produces the corresponding relevant Life Movement.

Faithlife also proceeds along lines of trust and hope. "Just as the believer's love for God in general is the subjective reflection of God's love for him in Christ, so, in particular, his childlike trust in God is also the reflection of the faithfulness and omnipotence of the divine Father's love." Trust conjoins virtues such as perseverance and patience, whereas hope has a telic and eschatological outlook, and the two are related:

Already as Trust in God, the Believer's love of God essentially refers to the Future; when the heart willingly places all its affairs in God's hand and lets him advise, it essentially loves God for what he still has in mind to do. The believer's trust in God is his love for Him as the one who will do everything well for him in the future. Where now this trust in God appears as confident Expectation of the discovery of a definite goal promised by God himself in the Word, which the heart has thus grasped in advance, as if it were already present, there it receives the name of hope (p. 14).

This future orientation of the Christian Faith character, taking it out of this world and directing it toward the next: "The believer's hope gives his whole life of will a heavenly direction and as it thus determines the goal of his endeavor, it also bestows upon him the power of steadfast and patient endurance in this endeavor, under all the tribulations of this world" (p. 16). Yet Faithlife also contains an aspect of the fear of God, which is akin to reverence and not mutually-exclusive from love:

What we would most like to denote with this expression is the childlike awe of God, the holy respect for his absolute majesty, which in the believer's heart is the subjective reflection of God's objective majesty and glory. The believer's love for God is not love for an inferior being or for a fellow human being or for a merely relatively superior being, it is love for an object that is absolutely exalted above the loving subject. For the believer as a child of God receives God as the heavenly Father, to whom he owes everything he is and has, his Creator, Savior and Lord.

This fear of God is profoundly doxologically-oriented, revolving around a recognition of the goal of all things in glorifying God: "The relevant revelation of this believer's childlike awe of God is the tribute that he gives to Him, that he honors Him as his God, gives Him the honor due to Him, and thus actually and practically recognizes His doxa, His Glory" (p. 17). It is in his consideration of the fear of God that Gisle exposits a taxonomy from Johan Albrecht Bengel, aligning his thought further with Lutheran pietism: “The various states of men: without fear and love, with fear without love, with fear and love, without fear with love” (p. 17, n. 3, quoting Bengel).

At the close of the work Gisle makes special application of ethics in its societal elements, considering the Christian's duty to the world as a sort of extension of the grace-restores-nature concept found in the Grundrids. Nostbakken observes that here Gisle "made some attempt at a union between Christianity and culture" and that his ethical emphases in society tended toward "bringing together widely divergent elements in the society of his day."

Gisle's ethics is thus somewhat unique in its relationship to dogmatics and faith on the one hand, and its implementation of strongly pietist and revivalist characteristics on the other. Rooting ethics in dogmatics was nothing new during his time, the ethics of Isaak Dorner and Herman Bavinck being just a few examples. Nonetheless, Nostbakken notes,

The peculiarity of Johnson's Ethics lies in his attempt to find a purely religious and Christian foundation for it. He presents the matter as a part of his theological system not merely as something which is appended, but as an integral part. The doctrine of Christian moral life-activity is inseperable from the conception of faith as living. The Pistics establishes the origin and the essence of faith; the Dogmatic presents the content of faith; and the Ethic presents the practice of faith active in love."

=== Lectures on Dogmatic History ===
In 1875 Gisle Johnson left the Chair of Theology at the University of Kristiana and took up the Chair of History. The reason for this move is variously evaluated; Nostbakken considers that Johnsons was burnt-out from his involvement in the revival movement as well as his involvement in various controversies, and thus wished to take himself out of the spotlight in light of new and emerging beliefs from Continental Europe. As such, "His material [in Lectures on Dogmatic History] was in order and systematically presented, but he seemed to have lost the dynamic presentation that had characterized his early lectures." Ousland thus states that "when he took over church history in the mid-70s, his influence as a lecturer was also over."

Nonetheless, the switch to a dogmatic history fits Gisle's overall doctrinal direction toward a stalwart Lutheran confessionalism and the tendencies of the Erlangen school, where Thomasius had also written a Die christliche Dogmengeschichte (History of Christian Dogmatics). The move toward articulating doctrine within historical progress thus fits well with what he had written in his Grundrids pertaining to the organic growth and development of the church in relation to the Word (Grundrids, s. 86-89). As such, in the preface to the 1898 publication (actually a publication of Gisle's lecture notes from 1890-1891), Wølner-Hansen writes, "Professor Dr. Gisle Johnson’s lectures on the history of dogma have rightly been regarded as one of the best of the late, highly esteemed teacher's excellent works."

In the introduction, Gisle attempts to situate the importance of his work within the greater sphere of his dogmatic project:

The concept of ecclesiastical doctrine, which is the rediscovery of the dogma of history, is the church's common confession of faith as it exists in a conceptually developed and determined form mediated by scientific and theological reflection. Insofar as theology sets itself the task of recognizing ecclesiastical doctrinal concepts in the form in which they actually exist at the present time, it receives the name of 'ecclesiastical symbol' which it has become, what it is now, it is usually called dogma-history.

Implementing more organicist language, Johnson desires to tie confessionalism to the organic growth of the faith of the individual in relation to the society of the church; using an agricultural metaphor found also in the Ethiks, he likens this historical growth to that of a sprout:

[T]he development of the ecclesiastical doctrine is an organic development. But an organic development necessarily includes a sprout, from which the development emerges. Also the organic development of the ecclesiastical doctrine presupposes a sprout, in which that which, after the development presents itself as the fruit of the development, is potentially present from the beginning, a sprout, which thus forms the starting point, the basis for the entire development, yes, is the subject of the development itself, that which in and through the development unfolds of itself the content of its hidden life and thus carries the whole development forward by its inner power. If the church doctrine is now the same as the church's confession of faith developed by reflection, it is thus a given that the starting point of the development, its living, fruitful sprout, can only be this church's confession in its original, basic form, independent of all reflection ("Introduction").

Here, Gisle's thought merges organicist concepts of being with Hegelian concepts of becoming:

As such an organic development, the development of the teaching concept also appears as a, as it has been called, dialectical development. It is organic in its content, dialectical in its form. Dialectical is a development that progresses through contradictions, and whose result appears as the product of the overcoming and cancellation of these contradictions ("Introduction").

The progress of the work itself is keen to analyze theological and controversial writings cross-denominationally, but through the lens of Lutheran Confessionalism. The chapter on predestination, for example, is highly critical of the thought of Zwingli and Calvin, responding from the perspective of the Formula Concord, which he believes to have helpfully preserved the mystery of God's will and the free agency of human volition, leaving God free from being the author of sin (p. 350). Similar constructive maneuvers are found throughout the work, handling source material from patristic period past the Reformation.

As such, instead of considering the switch to dogmatic history a recension for Gisle, it might be more helpful to consider it a more concerted culmination of his theological aims. Unlike the Grundrids or Ethiks, what is seen in the Dogmehistorien is a careful and concerted integration of the historical theological debates that he believed undergirded and vindicated the truth of the Lutheran Confessionalism. Likewise, whereas the former two works focused on dogmatic and ethical integration of biblical, theological, and philosophical concepts, the Dogmehistorien demonstrates his broad and eclectic exposure to figures from Nestorius to Chemnitz. The dogmatic historical analysis in these late lectures thus may provide a clearer picture into the objective doctrinal and confessional backbone that Gisle aimed toward in his subjective constructions in the Grundrids, although more work needs to be done in this area.

=== Theological controversies ===
During his lifetime Johnson was known not only as a theologians and revivalist, but also involved himself in the various ideological debates of his day at as what would today be called a public theologian. Two controversies in particular defined his career: Grundtvigianism, an experientialist sect stemming from the teachings of the Danish N.F.S. Grundtvig, and lay preaching, an essential part of the revivalist position that sought to allow non-ordained clergy the right to preach.

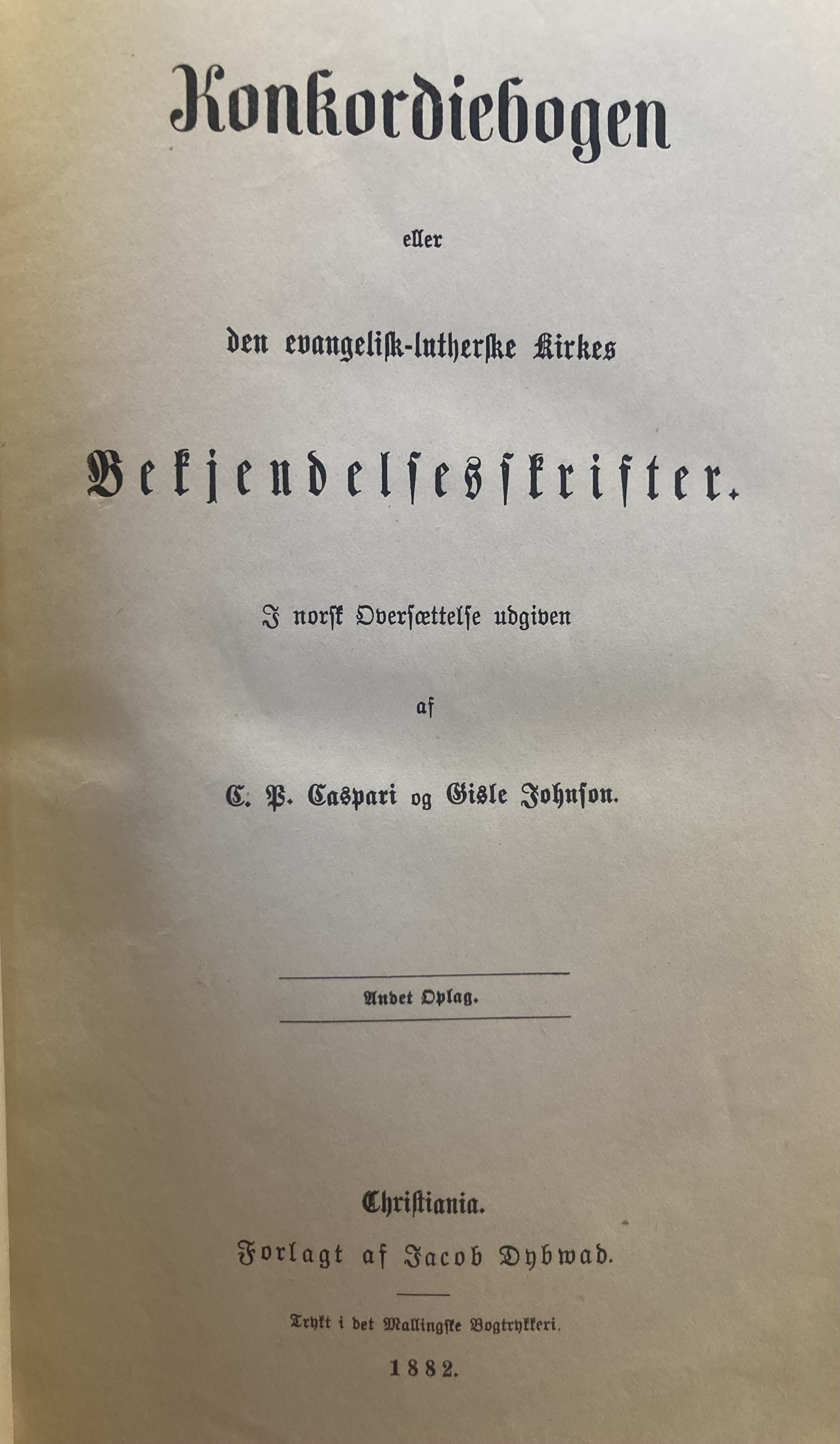
The title page of the 1882 edition of Johnson's translation of the Book of Concord into Norwegian.

Over and against the Grundtvigian position of experience over Scripture and tradition, Gisle argued for the sufficiency and authority of Scripture and the need for Lutheran Confessionalism, referring to it as "fanaticism." He worked diligently to translate the Book of Concord (with C.P. Caspari) into Norwegian, as well as revise the Norwegian translation of the Bible, both for accessibility to pastor and layperson alike.

Likewise, and with the issue of lay preaching, Gisle attempted to come to a confessionally-consistent application of the Augsburg Confession's Article XIV, which prohibited "public (offentlig) preaching." According to Johnson, the confessional standard must be held, yet interpreted with Martin Luther's statement of exigency, that "emergency situations break all laws." The controversy largely revolved around various considerations and definitions of the word offentlig ('public'), and the Norwegian Statskirke met several times to attempt to arrive at a sound understanding of how to reconcile practical considerations with the confessional standard. Although Gisle's teaching on this was meant to appeal to both high and low church alike, bringing together what had been a division between the more aristocratic High Church clergy with the more pietistic Low Church congregants, Johnson's approach became a sore spot for him, occasioning his resignation as chairman of the Inner Mission Society in 1890 and, subsequently, the formal repudiation of the emergency principle at the General Convention of 1891.

Retrospectively, Gisle's emergency principle has been variously evaluated: while Harris Kaasa considers Johnson's position "more moderate and more Lutheran" than other approaches during his time, and Jan Koren considered the lasting influence of Johnson's emergency principle into Norwegian-American Lutheranism, nonetheless Kaasa also deems Johnson's application and approach a "tactical error," and Richard Nostbakken notes that "In attempting to fuse two different elements within the church Johnson never really succeeded in pleasing anyone." Nonetheless, in his extended analysis of the lay preaching controversy, Harris Kaasa has pointed out the important function the debate had within shifting elements of the Norwegian church and society during the time, considering it within the context of classical Lutheran ecclesiological dialogues on the relationship between the visible versus invisible church, a doctrine Johnson himself draws from ubiquitously in the Dogmatiks.

=== Appraisal ===
Gisle Johnson's dogmatic distinguishes itself on several levels. Svein Åge Christoffersen describes Gisle's theological personality as a unique blend of a revivalist theology, an experiential theology, and a confessional theology within the Lutheran tradition. Indeed, Trygve Skarsten has argued that Confessionalism and Pietism are, in fact, the defining theological controls for Gisle's system: "...the basic controlling assumptions that molded and shaped the theology and churchmanship of Gisle Johnson, are to be found within these two movements." Skarsten recounts that,

When a question arose, Gisle Johnson would usually respond by asking two questions in return. What does the Bible say? What light do the confessional books of the Lutheran church throw upon the subject?

As such, although fitting generally within the school of Erlangen Theology, Johnson's theology has several distinguishing points that set his own dogmatic apart, Gisle himself being unafraid to break with certain facets of continental theology that he found to be not in-line with Scripture or tradition, e.g. Thomasius's kenoticism. His revivalism and experientialism remains tethered to confessional and biblical qualities, and his work contains copious quotations from the original Hebrew and Greek of the Old and New Testaments in tandem with Latin quotations from Confessions and Creeds, along with the occasion quotation from a Lutheran figure (such as Luther himself) in German. This underlying structuring from confessional and biblical material seems to indicate that his theology proceeds along an objective canonical and traditional level even though constructed subjectively and inductively from the presuppositions of faith. His thought was thus informed by these classical dogmatic dictates, and within this vein it is interesting to note the chronological progression of this theological project:

During the first few years when he lectured, Gisle Johnson's theological system did not include a "Christian Pistik." It was not until the spring semester of 1853 that he began to lecture on this subject which he called, "A Presentation of the First Part of Systematic Theology." Up until this time it had merely been an introduction to his "Christian Dogmatics."

More broadly speaking, Preus has observed that for Erlangen theologians, "personal experience was merely the starting point, not the vindication." Likewise, this helps explain the "groundwork" or "outline" nature of his thought, which is dense and almost scholastic in efficiency, proceeding from point to point with clear wording, focused logical progression of concepts, and copious footnoting of biblical and confessional material in the original languages. Even the focus on faith sets itself apart from similar treatments by Schleiermacher, Kierkegaard, and Dorner, revolving strongly around assumptions of ontological and essential properties cast in a classically Lutheran Law/Gospel paradigm.

Gisle's theology would go on to reshape the theological landscape of Norway and, subsequently, influence a generation of Norwegian immigrants to America. As such, although his writing and charisma seems to have waned toward the end of his career, Nostbakken concludes his analysis of Gisle's theological influence by stating "...the fact remains that Johnson has been the single most influential theologian in Norway's history. A wider knowledge of his works is deserved."

== Political views ==
Throughout his life Gisle Johnson was an active voice in the political affairs of Norway, the mid-to-late nineteenth century being a time of great cultural and political revitalization in the small nation's history, referred to as a "Golden Age" of Norwegian culture, or "The Age of National Romanticism." Having broken from Danish rule in 1814, Norway functioned as a largely independent parliamentary republic under the Swedish monarch until Norwegian parliament formally broke from the House of Bernadotte in 1905. This also meant that, during this period, the State Church (Statskirke) shifted from the jurisdiction of the Danish Lutheran Church and was now an independent Norwegian Lutheran Church, placing it in a unique position to deal with various social, political, and theological controversies on its own terms. Within this context, the Statskirk had to maneuver to minister to the increasing poverty and oppression of the industrial revolution, as well as offer a response to the growing call for socialist reforms, the escalating desire for full independence from Sweden, and the mass emigration movement known as the "America Fever" (Amerikafeber), the latter of which bearing some relationship to perceived ecclesial inflexibility of the Statskirk.

=== Government and authority ===
Within this dynamic context of nineteenth century Norway Gisle Johnson was known as a political conservative. In his Forelæsninger over den kristelige Ethik, he takes a traditional Protestant position of the subordination of the individual to state institutions as ordained by God: "Its Right as such rests not on any merely human, but essentially on a divine order" (Ethik, "Authority"). For Gisle, this extends to the Statskirke as well as the government, and it is within this scheme of delegated divine authority that Gisle voices concern about absolute democracy: "...this Christian concept of authority forms the diametrical opposite to the unchristian, anti-Christian idea of an absolute autocracy, a dominion that rests only on human arbitrariness, whether it is exercised by an absolute sole ruler or by a plurality of rulers or even by the People's Majority. Democratic despotism is just as unchristian as monarchical." As such, Gisle felt that popular sovereignty was dangerous, which he viewed from the standpoint of original sin, warning against secularization and asserting that "Sin is the Peoples' Corruption" (Ethiks, "Authority").

=== The Appeal ===
Gisle thus continued to advocate a form of government that was both monarchial and representative, under which the Statskirke was the sole religious institution. This is seen particularly in his 1883 "To the Christian Friends of our Nation," called the Appeal, published on the front page of Morgenbladet on January 28, 1883. Endorsed by 453 prominent signatories, the Appeal warned against free thought (fritænkeriet) as "the modern infidelity" and calling the nation back to "the Christian" view in contrast with "progressivism" and "radicalism." The Appeal created an immediate sensation and was widely panned as both polarizing in its extreme language, as well as out of touch with then-contemporary trends and concerns, with Frederik Peterson, the chair of theology succeeding Johnson, refusing to add his name to the document.

=== The Amerikafeber ===
Nonetheless, Gisle's appraisal of the Statskirk's response to the Amerikafeber was actually one of support and encouragement. In line with his own missional and pietistic emphases, Johnson broke with the common nationalist consensus that emigration was close to treason, and Skarsten notes that,

Gisle Johnson sought to instill a different attitude in the new generation of pastors who were being trained at the university. He encouraged many of the young men to go to America and establish a daughter church among the Norwegian immigrants. His influence upon Norwegian-American Lutheranism during its formative years came largely through the 107 theological students and pastors who emigrated to America and brought with them the confessional-pietistic outlook which they had acquired from their teacher, Gisle Johnson.

=== Missions and society ===
Likewise, and with regards to the social issues of overpopulation and poverty in burgeoning industrial Christiana, Gisle Johnson's pietistic emphases led to the social task of meeting evangelistic and spiritual needs for the ever-increasing slums and shantytowns of mid-century Norway. This was done through his leadership of the Inner Mission Society, which was pan-classist in emphasis and helped break down social barriers in light of its missional interests:

The Inner Mission Society was to serve as an arm of the church and help to preserve its integrity. The whole inner mission movement was regarded as a voluntary enterprise on the part of the church to further the work of spiritual awakening through the use of carefully selected lay people who were to distribute Christian literature and seek to help the spiritual and physical needs of those people who ordinarily did not seek the church.

== Works ==
- Grundrids af Den systematiske theologi (Outlines of systematic theology) (1878)
- Forelæsninger over dogmehistorien (Lectures on dogmatic history) (1898)
- Forelæsninger over den kristelige Ethik (Lectures on Christian Ethics) (1898)
- Nogle ord om barnedaaben (A Few Words on Infant Baptism) (1857)
- Konkordiebogen (The Book of Concord), translation with C.P. Caspari (1882)
- Bibelen (The Bible), revision of the Norwegian BS text with J.F. Dietrichson and C.P.P. Essendrop (1873 NT; 1876-1888 OT)

== See also ==
- Lutheran orthodoxy
- Erlangen Theology (Neo-Lutheranism)
