= Christian Friedrich Schmid =

German Lutheran theologian (1794-1852)

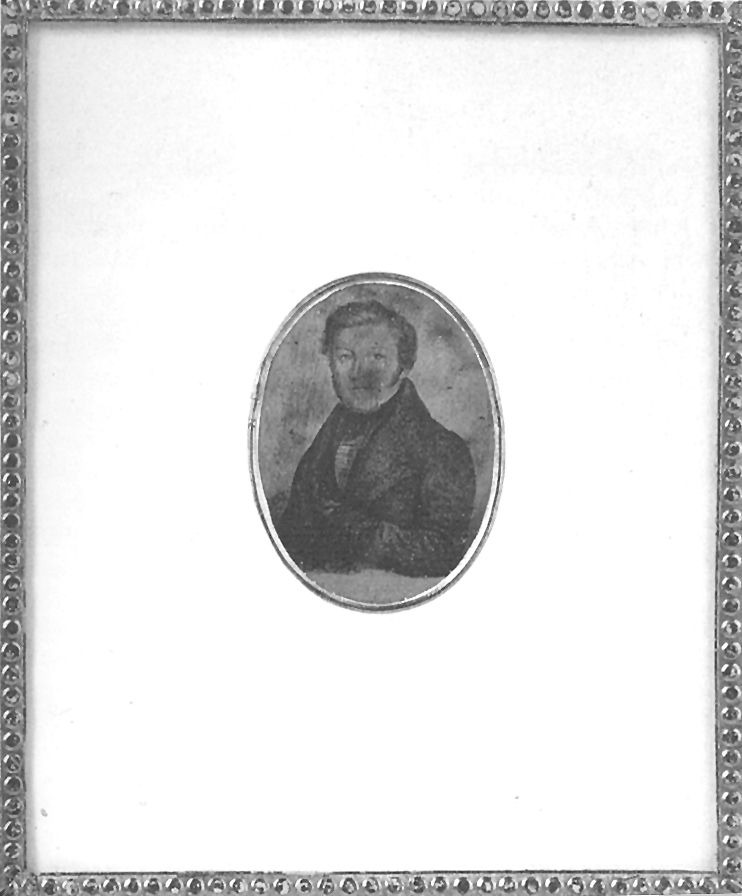
Christian Friedrich von Schmid (Lithography by Jacob Kull after a daguerreotypy)

Christian Friedrich Schmid (25 May 1794 – 28 March 1852) was a German Lutheran theologian, born in the village of Bickelsberg (now part of Rosenfeld), Württemberg.

== Life ==
He received his education at seminaries in Denkendorf, Maulbronn and Tübingen, later becoming an associate professor of practical theology at the University of Tübingen (1821). In 1826 he was appointed a full professor at Tübingen, a position he maintained for the rest of his career. He was a member of the committee for the Württemberg liturgy (1840) and of the council for church organization (1848).

He was influenced by the Tübingen supranaturalism of his era, and he worked hard for the positive foundations of Lutheranism, continuing a trend that dated back to the time of Johann Albrecht Bengel (1657–1752). He was considered an excellent instructor, his lectures primarily dealing with practical, moral and exegetical theology. Among his better known students were Philip Schaff (1819-1893), Isaak August Dorner (1809-1884) and William Julius Mann (1819-1892).

Among his better written efforts, Biblische Theologie des neuen Testaments, was published posthumously in 1853, and later translated into English as Biblical theology of the New Testament (1870). Another noted work, Christliche Sittenlehre ("Christian Ethics", 1861), was also published after his death.

He died in Tübingen.
