= Old Roman Symbol =

Earlier and shorter version of Apostles' Creed

The Old Roman Symbol (Latin: vetus symbolum romanum), or Old Roman Creed, is an earlier and shorter version of the Apostles' Creed. It was based on the 2nd-century idea of the Rule of Faith, a summary of core Christian beliefs, as advanced by such writers as Tertullian and Irenaeus. The declaration of faith for those receiving baptism (3rd century or earlier), which by the 4th century was everywhere tripartite in structure, followed Matthew 28:19 ("baptizing them in the name of the Father and of the Son and of the Holy Spirit"), which is part of the Great Commission.

== Most ancient witnesses ==
According to the Oxford Dictionary of the Christian Church, the first text attesting it is a letter to Pope Julius I in 340 or 341, and it has recently been argued that it developed in the context of the Arian controversy. Bettenson and Maunder further comment on this that Marcellus had been exiled from his diocese through Arian influence, thus spending two years at Rome, and finally left his creed with Julius, Bishop of Rome.

Additionally c. 400, Rufinus, a priest of Aquileia, left a Latin version in his Commentarius in Symbolum Apostolorum (P.L. xxi. 335B). He believed this to be the Roman creed as the "rule of faith" written by the Apostles at Jerusalem. About at the same time also Nicetas of Remesiana wrote an Explanatio Symboli (P.L. Lii. 865-874B) based on the Old Roman Symbol, but including also the communion of saints.

Though the name "Apostles' Creed" appears in a letter of Saint Ambrose (c. 390), what is now known as the Apostles' Creed is first quoted in its present form in the early 8th century. It developed from the Old Roman Symbol, and seems to be of Hispano-Gallic origin, being accepted in Rome some time after Charlemagne imposed it throughout his dominions.

== Latin and Greek versions ==
The Latin text of Tyrannius Rufinus:

Credo in deum patrem omnipotentem;
et in Christum Iesum filium eius unicum, dominum nostrum,
qui natus est de Spiritu sancto ex Maria virgine,
qui sub Pontio Pilato crucifixus est et sepultus,
tertia die resurrexit a mortuis,
ascendit in caelos,
sedet ad dexteram patris, unde venturus est iudicare vivos et mortuos;
et in Spiritum sanctum,
sanctam ecclesiam,
remissionem peccatorum,
carnis resurrectionem.

The Greek text of Marcellus of Ancyra:

Πιστεύω οὖν εἰς θεòν πατέρα παντοκράτορα·
καὶ εἰς Χριστὸν Ἰησοῦν, τὸν υἱὸν αὐτοῦ τὸν μονογενῆ, τὸν κύριον ἡμῶν,
τὸν γεννηθέντα ἐκ πνεύματος ἁγίου καὶ Μαρίας τῆς παρθένου,
τὸν ἐπὶ Ποντίου Πιλάτου σταυρωθέντα καὶ ταφέντα
καὶ τῇ τρίτῃ ἡμέρα ἀναστάντα ἐκ τῶν νεκρῶν,
ἀναβάντα εἰς τοὺς οὐρανούς
καὶ καθήμενον ἐν δεξιᾳ τοῦ πατρός, ὅθεν ἔρχεται κρίνειν ζῶντας καὶ νεκρούς·
καὶ εἰς τò ἅγιον πνεῦμα,
ἁγίαν ἐκκλησίαν,
ἄφεσιν ἁμαρτιῶν,
σαρκὸς ἀνάστασιν,
ζωὴν αἰώνιον.

=== Differences between the Latin and the Greek text ===
The Latin (Rufinus) and the Greek (Marcellus) versions are faithful, literal, verbatim translations of each other. The only outstanding difference is the concluding clause in the Greek text, ζωὴν αἰώνιον ("life everlasting"), which has no equivalent in the Latin text. This clause is present in the Apostles' Creed.

The Latin version of Nicetas of Remesiana also follows quite closely the version of Rufinus (usually verbatim) but also includes the vitam eternam, as Marcellus, and the communionem sanctorum, omitted by the other two.

== English translation ==
I believe in God the Father almighty;
and in Christ Jesus His only Son, our Lord,
Who was born of the Holy Spirit and the Virgin Mary,
Who under Pontius Pilate was crucified and buried,
on the third day rose again from the dead,
ascended to heaven,
sits at the right hand of the Father,
whence He will come to judge the living and the dead;
and in the Holy Spirit,
the holy Church,
the remission of sins,
the resurrection of the flesh
(the life everlasting).

== See also ==
- Nicene Creed
- Athanasian Creed
- Filioque clause

== Bibliography ==
- Kelly, John Norman Davidson (1972), Early Christian Creeds, Longman.
