= August Müller (orientalist) =

German orientalist (1848–1892)

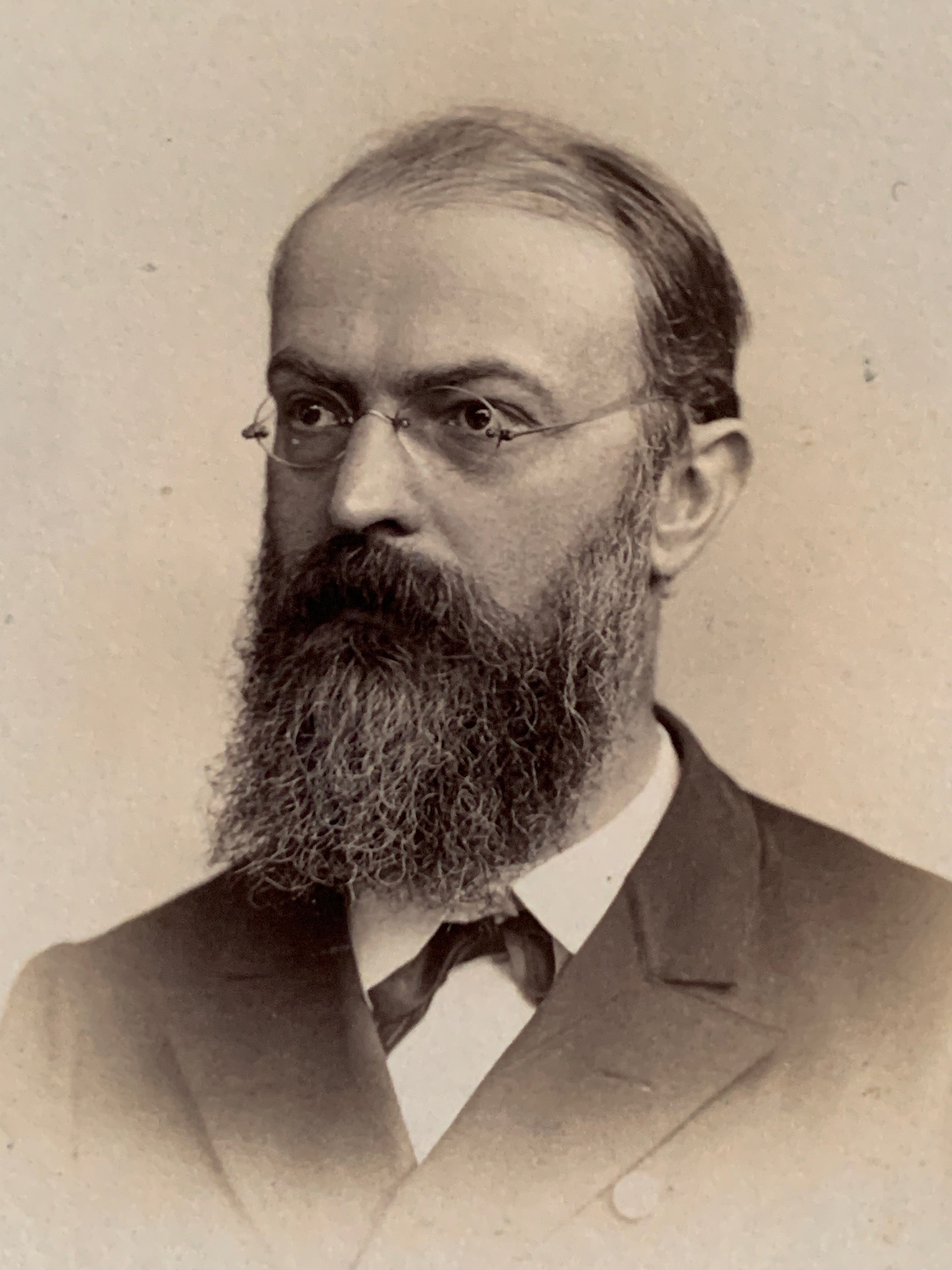
Image of August Muller

August Müller (born 3 December 1848 in Stettin; died 12 September 1892 in Halle an der Saale) was a German orientalist.

== Biography ==
He was educated in classical philology and Semitic studies at the universities of Halle and Leipzig, where he was a student of Heinrich Leberecht Fleischer. In 1874, he became an associate professor, and in 1882 accepted the post of professor of oriental philology at the University of Königsberg. In 1890, he returned as a professor to the University of Halle.

== Works ==
- Die Griechischen Philosophen in der Arabischen Überlieferung ("The Greek philosophers in the Arab tradition", 1873).
- Der Islam im Morgen- und Abendland (“Islam in the west and the orient”; 1885–87).
- Hebräische Schulgrammatik (“Hebrew school grammar”; 1878), the syntax of which was translated into English by James Robertson.
- Reedition (1876), Caspari's Arabische Grammatik, which he considerably enlarged.
- Delectus Veterum Carminum Arabicorum (1890, with Nöldeke), furnished with copious annotations, and thus rendered useful to those who desire to become acquainted with Arabic poetry.
- Edition (1884) of Ibn Useibia's History of Physicians, with Arabic text and a critical commentary online.

Several of his essays are contained in the "Zeitschrift der deutschen morgenländischen Gesellschaft" and "Beiträge zur Kunde der indogermanischen Sprachen". In 1887, he was appointed editor of the Orientalische Bibliographie.
