= Pelbartus Ladislaus of Temesvár =

Hungarian writer and preacher, b. 1430

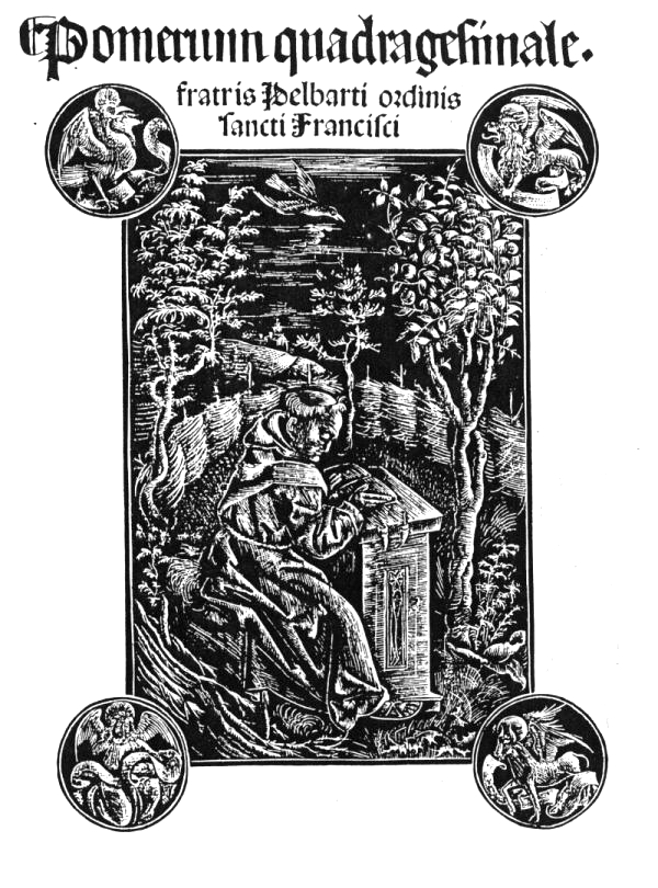
Temesvári Pelbárt Pomerium.jpg

Pelbartus Ladislaus de Temesvár (or Temeswar) (1430 – 9 January 1504) was a Franciscan writer and preacher.

== Life ==
He was born in 1430 in Temesvár, Hungary (now Timișoara, Romania). In 1458 he went to the University of Kraków. In 1463 he was licensed in Theology. Possibly in 1471 he left Kraków as a doctor, then in 1483 he is mentioned in the Franciscan Community Annales of the St. John Monastery in Buda, the Hungarian capital city. After 1483 his writings began to be published in print. The first printed edition of his Sermons dates from 1498. In 1503 a printed version of his lecture notes was published. Pelbartus died on 9 January 1504 in Buda, as a highly distinguished author and professor. Hungarian versions of his writings in manuscript date from 1510.

== Works ==
He is remembered for two kinds of texts: sermons (many of them treating the Immaculate Conception) and Commentaries on Sentences of Petrus Lombardus. His final work is a synthesis called Aureum Sacrae Theologiae Rosarium – finished by his student Oswald of Lasko.

=== Editions ===
- Expositio Compendiosa et Familiaris Sensum Litteralem et Mysticum Complectens Libri Psalmorum, Hymnorum, Soliloquorum Regii Prophetae, item Expositio Canticorum V. et N. Testamenti, Symboli Athanasii, Hymni Universales Creaturae (a.o. Strassbourg, 1487/ Hagenau, 1504 and 1513).
- Pomerium Sermonum de Tempore (s.l., 1489/Hagenau, 1498 and 1500). There are other editions as well, possibly 12, between 1501 and 1520.
- Pomerium Sermonum de Sanctis (a.o. Hagenau, 1499 and 1500). 11 editions between 1501 and 1520.
- Pomerium Sermonum Quadragesimalium/Qauadragesimale Triplex (a.o. Hagenau, 1499 and 1500). Nine editions before 1520.
- Sermones (Nuremberg, 1483/s.l., 1486).
- Stellarium Coronae Mariae Virginis (a.o. Hagenau, Heinrich Gran and Johannes Rynman, 2 Maii, 1498/ Strasbourg, 1496/Basel, Jacobus Wolff de Pforzheim, 1497–1500).
- Aureum Sacrae Theologiae Rosarium iuxta Quattuor Sententiarum Libros Pariformiter Quadripartitum (4 books) IV Vol. (Hagenau: Heinrich Gran, 1503-1508/Venice, 1586 and 1589/Brescia, 1590). This work has been finished by Oswald of Lasko. It is a dogmatic work where Pelbartus comments upon Scottist texts. Has references to Duns Scotus, St. Bonaventure, Thomas Aquinas, and William of Vorrilon.

== Bibliography ==
- Z. J. Kosztolnyik, Some Hungarian Theologians in the Late Renaissance, Church History. Volume: 57. Issue: 1, 1988.
- Z. J. Kosztolnyik, Pelbartus of Temesvar: a Franciscan Preacher and Writer of the Late Middle Ages in Hungary, Vivarium, 5/1967.
- Kenan B. Osborne, O.F.M., The History of Franciscan Theology, The Franciscan Institute St. Bonaventure, New York City, 1994.
- Franklin H. Littell (ed.), Reformation Studies, John Knox Press, Richmond, Virginia, 1962.
