= William Doerner =

Professor in criminology and criminal justice

William G. Doerner
- Born: March 28, 1949 (age 77); Bridgeport, Connecticut

Academic background
- Education: UT-Knoxville (Ph.D., 1977); Emory (M.A., 1973); Fairfield (B.A., 1971)

Academic work
- Discipline: Criminal Justice
- Institutions: Florida State
- Awards: John P. J. Dussich Award (2009, ASV); Outstanding Educator of the Year (2001, SCJA); Outstanding Teaching Award (1998, FSU)

William (Bill) G. Doerner (born 1949) is a professor in the College of Criminology and Criminal Justice at Florida State University.

His research has covered topics such as criminal justice, delinquency, law enforcement, police management and procedures, and victimology.

== Biography ==
Doerner was born in Bridgeport, Connecticut. He graduated from Fairfield University (in Fairfield, Connecticut) with a B.A. in Sociology in 1971. Continuing directly into graduate studies, he received his M.A. from Emory University (in Atlanta, Georgia) two years later and his Ph.D. in Sociology from the University of Tennessee (in Knoxville, Tennessee) in 1977. While working on his dissertation, he taught and conducted research at Marquette University (in Milwaukee, Wisconsin). Upon completion of his doctoral studies, he accepted a position in the College of Criminology & Criminal Justice at Florida State University where he currently teaches courses to undergraduate and graduate students.

Several years after beginning as an assistant professorship, a neighbor invited him to ride along with county sheriff deputies. In 1980, he began working as a part-time reserve officer with the Tallahassee Police Department. Besides serving as a one-person patrol unit, he lectured at the state-established Pat Thomas Law Enforcement Academy, evaluated police training programs, and provided in-service training to dispatchers and veteran officers. In the 1990s, he conducted a police training seminar for the National Police Academy in Costa Rica that was sponsored by the Universidad de Costa Rica and the Florida/Costa Rica (FLORICA) Linkage Institute. Doerner retired from policing in 2010.

Throughout his academic career, Doerner has drawn on his practical experiences in law enforcement to write several textbooks and over sixty journal articles, book chapters, reviews, and monographs. He has served as editor for the American Journal of Criminal Justice and on the board of directors for the Southern Criminal Justice Association. In 2009, he was recognized for "significant contributions to the field of victimology and victim services" by the American Society of Victimology.

== Selected publications ==
Text Books

- Doerner, William G. and Steven P. Lab (2008). Victimology (5th ed.). LexisNexis/Anderson Publishing Company. ISBN 978-1-59345-506-4.
- William G. Doerner (2007). Introduction to Law Enforcement: An Insider's View (3rd ed.). Kendall/Hunt. ISBN 978-0-7575-0824-0.
- William G. Doerner and Charles W. Rushing (2002). Study Guide for the Florida Law Enforcement Officer's Certification Examination (2nd ed.). Pineapple Press. ISBN 1-56164-109-X.
- William G. Doerner and M. L. Dantzker (2000). Contemporary Police Organization and Management: Issues and Trends. Butterworth-Heinemann Press. ISBN 0-7506-7137-8.
- William G. Doerner, William E. Thornton and Lydia Voigt (1987). Delinquency and Justice (2nd ed.). Random House. ISBN 978-0-394-34741-7.

Journal Articles

- William M. Doerner and William G. Doerner (2010). "Collective Bargaining and Job Benefits: The Case of Florida Deputy Sheriffs" (PDF). Police Quarterly. 13 (4). SAGE: 367–386. doi:10.1177/1098611110384084. S2CID 154970159.
- William G. Doerner and William M. Doerner (2009). "The Diffusion of Accreditation among Florida Police Agencies". Policing: An International Journal of Police Strategies & Management. 32 (4). Emerald: 781–798. doi:10.1108/13639510911000812.
- Robert C. Lightfoot and William G. Doerner (2008). "Student Success and Failure in a Graduate Criminology/Criminal Justice Program". American Journal of Criminal Justice. 33 (1). Springer: 113–129. doi:10.1007/s12103-007-9029-4. S2CID 143415239.
- William G. Doerner and Robert C. Lightfoot (2008). "Anatomy of a Ph.D. Program". ACJS Today. 33 (2): 13–19.
- Ronald D. Hunter and William G. Doerner (2006). "Enhancing ACJS Conferences for Our Membership". ACJS Today. 31 (1): 6–11.
