= August Dorner =

German theologian

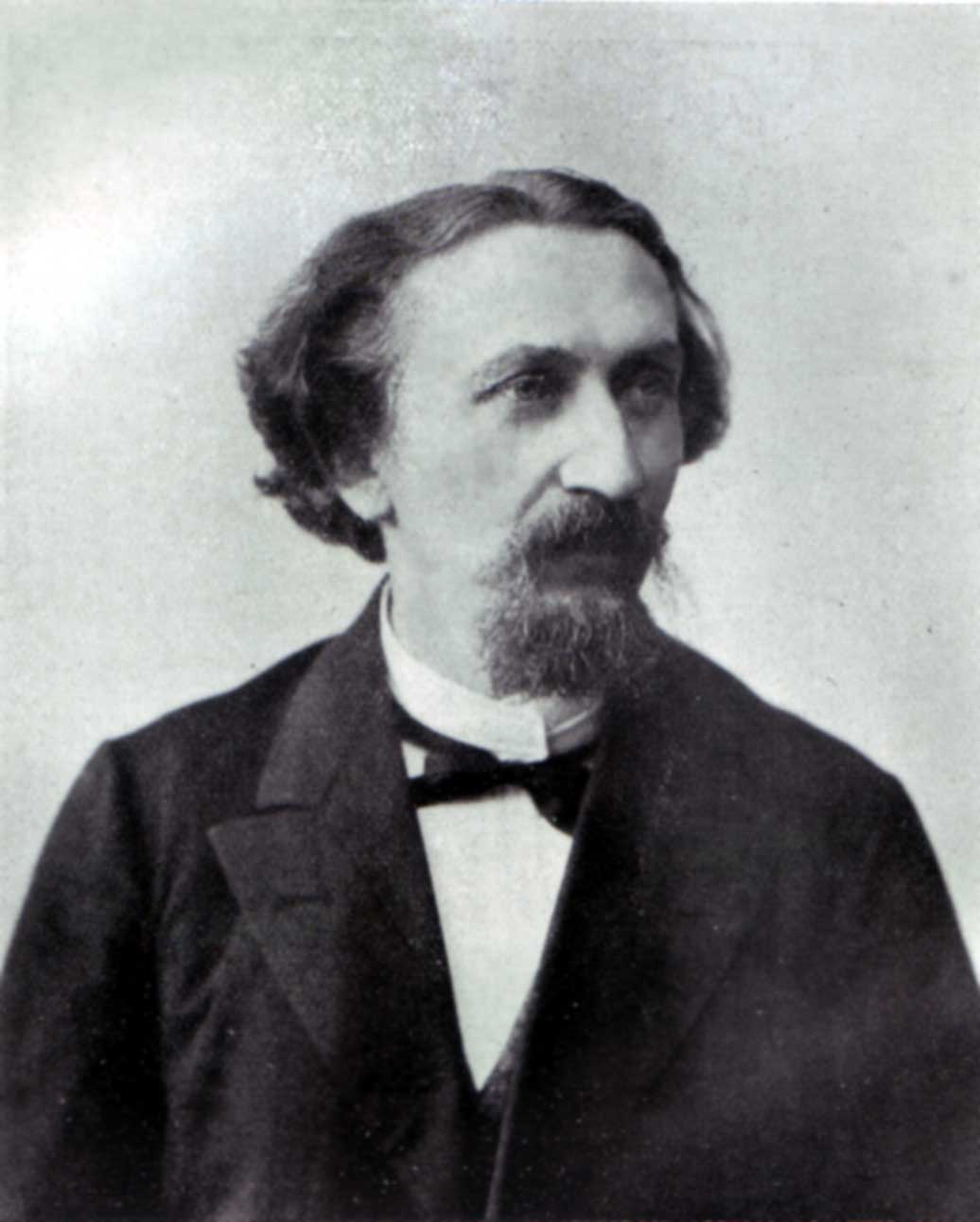
August Johannes Dorner

August Johannes Dorner (13 May 1846 – 17 April 1920) was a German Protestant theologian. He was the son of Isaak August Dorner.

== Biography ==
Dorner was born on 13 May 1846 in Schiltach, Kingdom of Württemberg. He studied at Göttingen, Tübingen and Berlin. He earned his doctorate in philosophy in Berlin in 1867 and his licentiate in theology in 1869. Afterwards, he became a vicar in the small village of Neuhausen. He also served as vicar to the German congregation in Lyon and Marseille. From 1870 to 1873 he was a lecturer at the University of Göttingen, then worked as a professor of theology and as co-director of the theological seminary at Wittenberg (1874–1889). In 1883, he was awarded an honorary doctorate by the University of Halle. In 1889 he was appointed professor of systematic theology at the University of Königsberg.

He died on 17 April 1920 in Hanover.

== Published works ==
Amongst his works is Augustinus : sein theologisches System und seine religionsphilosoph Anschauung ("Augustinus, his theological system and its religious-philosophical viewpoint", 1873). His other principal writings include:

- De Baconis baronis de Verulamio philosophia. 1867
- Über die Prinzipien der Kantschen Ethik. 1875
- Schelling, zur Erinnerung an seinen hundertjährigen Geburtstag. 1875
- Predigten vom Reiche Gottes. 1880
- Kirche und Reich Gottes. 1883
- Das menschliche Handeln : philosophische Ethik, 1895 – Human action: philosophical ethics.
- Die Entstehung der christlichen Glaubenslehren, 1906 – The emergence of Christian doctrines.
- Individuelle und soziale Ethik, 1906 – Individual and social ethics.
- Die Einheit der Wissenschaften im Organismus der Universität. 1909
- Encyklopädie der Philosophie, mit besonderer Berücksichtigung der Erkenntnistheorie und Kategorienlehre. 1910
- Pessimismus, Nietzsche und naturalismus, mit besonderer beziehung auf die religion, 1911 – Pessimism; Nietzsche and naturalism with a special reference to religion.
- Die Metaphysik des Christentums, 1913 – The metaphysics of Christianity.
- Also, he was the author of the article on Isaak Dorner in the Allgemeine deutsche Biographie.

== Legacy ==
Dorner is commemorated in the naming of the August-Dorner-Ring in Lantershofen, Grafschaft.
