= Carl Paul Caspari =

Norwegian neo-Lutheran theologian and academic

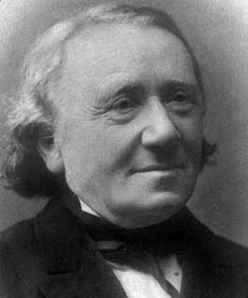
- Born: 8 February 1814; Dessau-Roßlau, Germany
- Died: 11 April 1892 (aged 78); Kristiania (now Oslo, Norway)
- Occupations: Theologian, teacher

Carl Paul Caspari (8 February 1814 – 11 April 1892) was a Norwegian neo-Lutheran theologian and academic. He was a Professor of Old Testament Theology at the University of Oslo. He wrote several books and is best known for his interpretations and translation of the Old Testament.

== Early life ==
Carl Caspari was born in Dessau of Jewish parentage and was brought up in the Jewish faith. From 1834 to 1838 he studied at the University of Leipzig, where he acquired a knowledge of Arabic and Persian under Heinrich Leberecht Fleischer. Partly from the influence of fellow students, among whom was Franz Delitzsch, he adopted Christianity and was baptized with the middle name Paul in 1838. His Jewish training naturally fitted him for work in Old Testament exegesis, and he spent two years at University of Berlin studying under German Lutheran neo-Lutheran theologian Ernst Wilhelm Hengstenberg.

== Career ==
In 1842 he earned a doctor of philosophy at the University of Leipzig, and in 1847 he accepted a call to the University of Christiania (now University of Oslo) where he remained for the rest of his life, declining calls to University of Rostock in 1850, to University of Tartu in 1856, and to University of Erlangen-Nuremberg in 1857 and again in 1867.

His linguistic ability enabled him speedily to master the Norwegian language, so that he could begin lectures in less than a year. He was made full professor in 1857. In his university work Caspari interpreted various books of the Old and New Testaments and treated Old Testament introduction. His lectures were inspiring, thorough, earnest, and bore evidence of a living Christian faith. In his exegesis and apologetics he followed Ernst Wilhelm Hengstenberg and remained to the end an opponent of modern critical scholarship.

But his work and interest were not confined to the Old Testament field. In 1825 a Danish preacher, N. F. S. Grundtvig, propounded peculiar views, viz., that the baptismal formula, the renunciation, the Lord's Prayer, and the words of the Lord's Supper come directly from the Lord, have never been changed, and therefore stand above the Scriptures. The view found adherents in Denmark and Norway, and fear was felt that the formal principle of the Lutheran Church was in danger. Caspari undertook a careful investigation of the questions connected with the baptismal formula, and its history and thus was led on to extensive ecclesiasticopatristic studies. He published a long series of articles and books as the result, most of them in the Norwegian language.

In 1862, together with Gisle Johnson, he published a Norwegian translation of the Book of Concord (Konkordieboken), which was published in 1866, and later in several reprints. He was a member of the Central Committee of the Norwegian Bible Society (Det Norske Bibelselskap). He assisted in making a new translation of the Old Testament, which was completed for the seventy-fifth anniversary of the Society on 26 May 1891.

He was chairman of the Central Committee of the Norwegian mission among the Jews (Den Norske Israelsmisjonen) from 1866 to his death in 1892. At the time of his death he was also working on a new translation of the New Testament. He died in Christiania (now Oslo, Norway).

== Other works ==
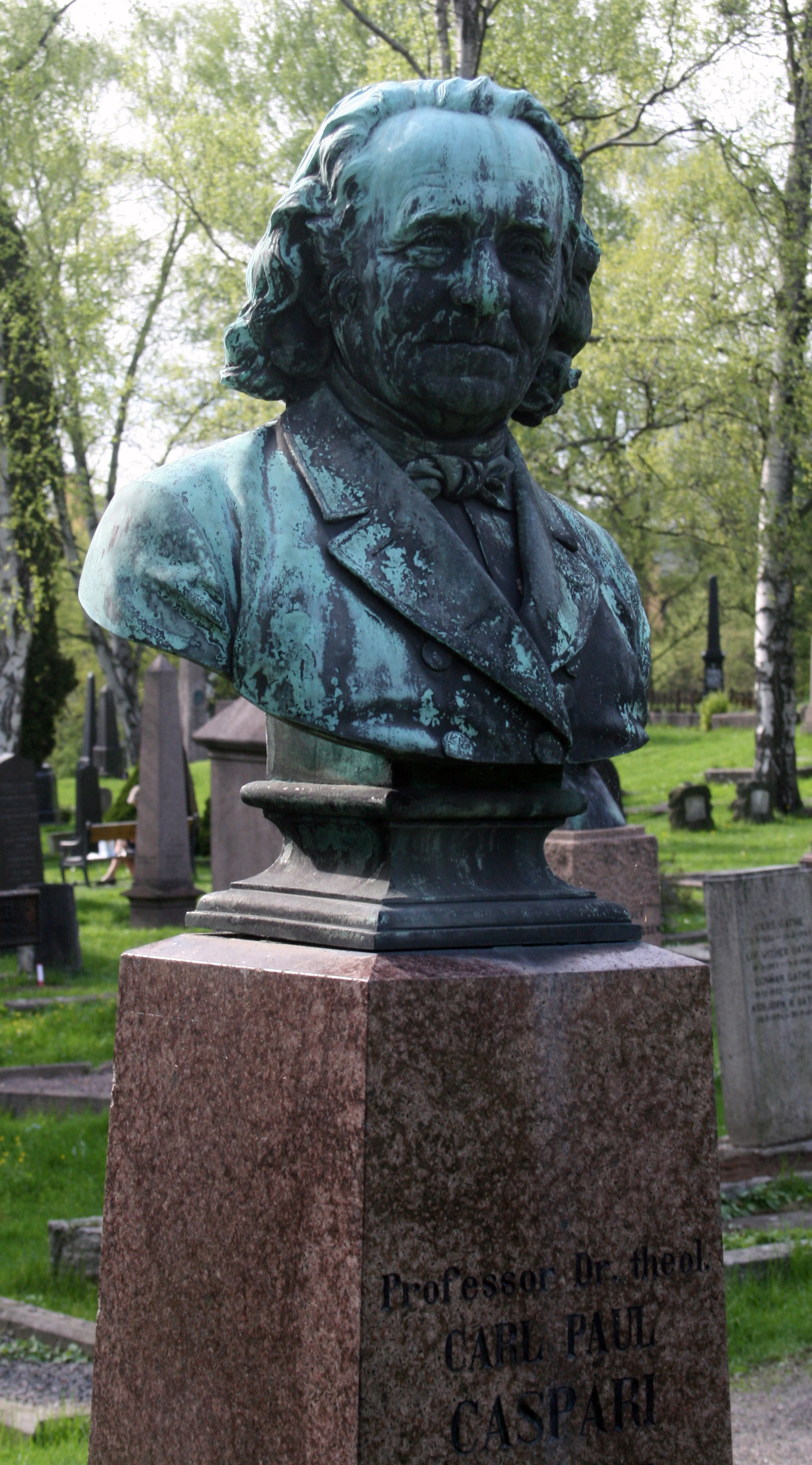
Carl Paul Caspari bust at Vår Frelsers gravlund, Oslo

He published an essay upon the Wandering Jew (1862); a commentary on the first six chapters of Isaiah (1867); a historical essay on the confession of faith at baptism (1871); on Abraham's trial and Jacob's wrestling with God (1871); on Abraham's call and meeting with Melchizedek (1872); a volume of Bible essays (1884).

With Gisle Johnson he established in 1857 the Theologisk Tidskrift for den evangelisk-lutherske Kirke i Norge, of which a volume appeared annually until shortly before Caspari's death. Most of the articles were written by the editors, and in this and other periodicals a large number of Caspari's writings were originally published.

== Selected publications ==
- Exegetisches Handbuch zu den Propheten des Alten Bundes (Leipzig, 1842. "A commentary on Obadiah" with Franz Delitzsch)
- Grammatica Arabica (2 parts, Leipzig, 1844–48; 5th Germ. ed., by August Müller, Halle, 1887; Eng. ed., by W. Wright, London, 1859–62, 1874–75; by W. Robertson Smith and M. J. de Goeje, Cambridge, 1896–98)
- Beiträge zur Einleitung in das Buch Jesaia und zur Geschichte der jesaianischen Zeit (vol. ii, of Delitzseh and Caspari's Biblisch-theologische und apologetisch-kritische Studien, Berlin, 1848)
- Ueber den syrischephraimitischen Krieg unter Jotham und Ahas (Christiania, 1849)
- Ueber Micha den Morasthiten und seine prophetische Schrift (2 parts, 1851–52)
- Ungedruckte, unbeachtete und wenig beachtete Quellen zur Geschichte des Taufsymbols und der Glaubensregel (3 vols., 1866–75)
- Zur Einführung in das Buch Daniel (Leipzig, 1869)
- Alte und neue Quellen zur Geschichte des Taufsymbols und der Glaubensregel (Christiania, 1879); an edition of Martin of Braga's De correctione rusticorum (1883)
- Kirchenhistorische Anecdota nebst neuen Ausgaben patristischer und kirchlich-mittelalterlicher Schriften (1883)
- Eine Augustin fälschlich beigelegte Homilia de sacrilegiis (1886)
- Briefe, Abhandlungen und Predigten aus den zwei letzten Jahrhunderten des kirchlichen Alterthums und dem Anfang des Mittelalters (1891)
- Das Buch Hiob in Hieronymus's Uebersetzung (Christiania, 1893).
- Der Glaube an der Trinität Gottes in der Kirche des ersten christlichen Jahrhunderts nachgewiesen (Leipzig, 1894).

== Related reading ==
- Schaff, Philip (1952) New Schaff-Herzog Encyclopedia of Religious Knowledge, Vol. II: Basilica - Chambers (Grand Rapids: Christian Classics Ethereal Library)
- Larcher, Pierre (2014) « L’étrange destin d’un livre : la soi-disant Grammaire arabe de William Wright (1830-1889) », Historiographia Linguistica 41/1, p. 109-126.
