= Isaak August Dorner =

German Lutheran church leader (1809–1884)

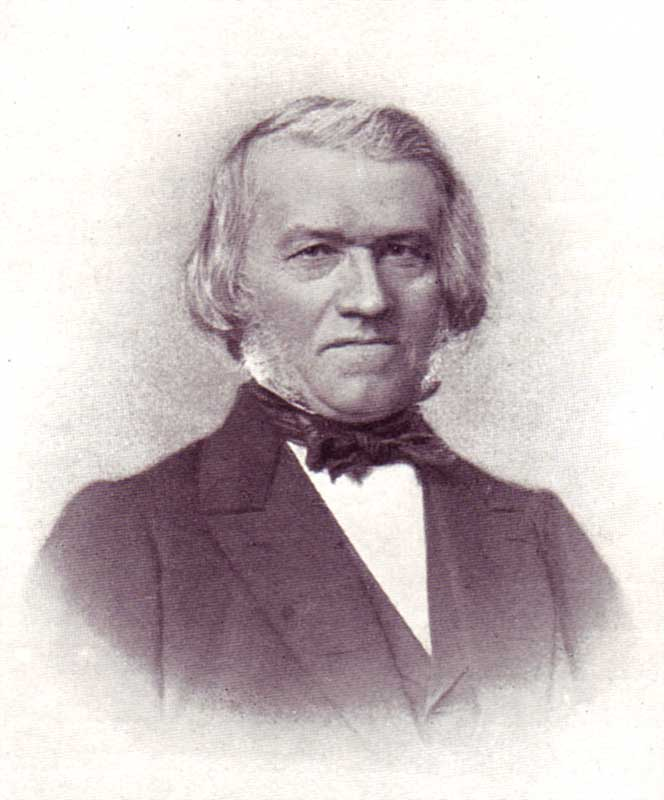
- Born: June 20, 1809; Neuhausen ob Eck, Kingdom of Württemberg
- Died: July 8, 1884 (aged 75); Wiesbaden, German Empire
- Education: University of Tübingen
- Occupations: theologian, university professor
- Children: August Dorner

Isaak August Dorner (20 June 1809 – 8 July 1884) was a German Lutheran theologian. He served as a professor of theology at various institutions, including Tübingen, Kiel, Königsberg, Bonn, Göttingen, and Berlin. He was a meditating theologian and had an international influence. His primary work has been translated into English.

== Life ==
He was born at Neuhausen ob Eck in the Kingdom of Württemberg, where his father was pastor in the Lutheran Church. He was educated at Maulbronn and the University of Tübingen. After assisting his father for two years, he travelled in England and the Netherlands to complete his studies and acquaint himself with different types of Protestantism. He returned to Tübingen in 1834, and in 1837 was appointed professor extraordinarius of theology. As a student at the university, one of his teachers had been Christian Friedrich Schmid, author of the well-known Biblische Theologie des Neuen Testamentes and one of the most vigorous opponents of F. C. Baur. Dorner, in collaboration with Schmid, initiated a significant opposition to the Tübingen School, which was at the height of its activity and influence during that period.

Dorner first gained recognition for his extensive study of the history of Christology, which explores the evolution of Christology from the end of the apostolic age to contemporary times. Initially published in the Theological Quarterly Review of Tübingen, it was later released as an expanded standalone volume. At Schmid's suggestion, and with his encouragement, Dorner set to work on the history of the development of the doctrine of the person of Christ, Entwicklungsgeschichte der Lehre von der Person Christi. He published the first part of it in 1835, the year in which David Strauss, his colleague, published his Life of Jesus; completed it in 1839, and afterwards considerably enlarged it for a second edition (1845–1856). It was an indirect reply to Strauss, which showed, "profound learning, objectivity of judgment, and fine appreciation of the moving ideas of history" (Otto Pfleiderer). Dorner undertook a comprehensive revision of this work, resulting in a substantial increase in length, more than doubling the original content.

Dorner at once became highly regarded as a theologian and historian and in 1839 was invited to Kiel as professor ordinarius. It was there that he produced Das Princip unserer Kirche nach dem innern Verhältniss seiner zwei Seiten betrachtet (1841). In 1843 he moved as professor of theology to Königsberg. From there he was called to Bonn in 1847, and to Göttingen in 1853. Finally in 1862 he settled as a professor at Berlin, where he was a member of the supreme consistorial council of the Evangelical State Church in Prussia. A few years later (1867) he published his valuable Geschichte der protestantischen Theologie (English translation, History of Protestant Theology, 2 volumes; 1871), in which he "developed and elaborated," as Pfleiderer says, "his own convictions by his diligent and loving study of the history of the Church’s thought and belief."

The theological positions to which he ultimately attained are best seen in his Christliche Glaubenslehre, published shortly before his death (1879–1881). It is "a work extremely rich in thought and matter. It takes the reader through a mass of historical material by the examination and discussion of ancient and modern teachers, and so leads up to the author's own view, which is mostly one intermediate between the opposite extremes, and appears as a more or less successful synthesis of antagonistic theses" (Pfleiderer). The companion work, System der christlichen Sittenlehre, was published by his son August Dorner in 1886. He also contributed articles to Herzog-Hauck's Realencyklopädie, and was the founder and for many years one of the editors of the Jahrbücher fur deutsche Theologie.

In the context of the 1848 Revolution, Dorner authored a significant essay addressing the critical issue of the separation of church and state. This publication positioned him as an important figure in the early development of "the German Evangelical Church Day" (Deutschen Evangelischen Kirchentags), highlighting his influence on the ecclesiastical and socio-political discourse of the era.

Dorner died at Wiesbaden on 8 July 1884. One of the most noteworthy of the "mediating" theologians, he has been ranked with Friedrich Schleiermacher, August Neander, Karl Nitzsch, Julius Müller and Richard Rothe.

His son, August Dorner, also became a prominent theologian.
