= List of Fairfield University alumni =

The following is a list of notable graduates of Fairfield University in Fairfield, Connecticut.

== Notable alumni ==
=== Arts and entertainment ===
- The Alternate Routes – alternative rock band formed by Eric Donnelly (2001) and Tim Warren (2003)
- Mark Ambor (2020) - Alternative/Indie singer-songwriter
- Donatella Arpaia (1993) – New York City restaurateur; judge on the Food Network reality TV series The Next Iron Chef
- Connor Campbell (2018) - Boston Connor personality on The Pat McAfee Show
- Joe DeCamara (2000) – sports radio personality for 94.1 WIP in Philadelphia
- Edward J. Delaney (1979) – award-winning author; Professor of Creative Writing, Roger Williams University
- Joe DeVito (1990) – comedian and writer; appeared on Comedy Central's "Live at Gotham" and NBC's Last Comic Standing
- Bob Drury (1980) – New York Times Bestselling author
- Paul Fargis (1961) – founder of Stonesong, publisher of several bestselling reference books
- Githa Hariharan (1977) – Commonwealth Writers' Prize-winning author and editor
- Pat Jordan (1965) – acclaimed author of A False Spring, ranked #37 on Sports Illustrated's 100 Top Sports Books
- Burt Kearns (1978) – founder, Frozen Television/Frozen Pictures; author, Tabloid Baby; producer, A Current Affair
- Adam LaVorgna (2011) – actor best known as Robbie Palmer in the TV series 7th Heaven
- January LaVoy (1997) – actress best known as Noelle Ortiz on the ABC daytime drama One Life to Live
- Paul Marcarelli (1992) – actor/screenwriter best known as the face of the Verizon Wireless "Can You Hear Me Now?" national TV campaign
- Peter McCann (1970) – singer/songwriter, best known for "Do You Wanna Make Love" (1977)
- Jared Mezzocchi (2007) - two-time OBIE Award-winning theater artist
- Neil Peng – Taiwanese screenwriter and political activist
- Paul Ryan Rudd (1970) – actor who played John F. Kennedy in the 1977 NBC movie Johnny, We Hardly Knew Ye
- Rob Stevenson (1992) – president of Virgin Records US
- Melissa Tantaquidgeon Zobel (2012) – Mohegan author, historian, and storyteller
- Jim Wilbur (1986) – guitarist for indie-rock band Superchunk

=== Academia ===
- Melissa Begg (1985) – Dean, Columbia University School of Social Work
- Ronald A. Bosco (1967) – Distinguished Professor of English and American Literature, University at Albany
- Rebecca Cantor (2004) - President, Austin College
- Rebecca Miriam Cunningham (1992) – President, University of Minnesota
- William Doerner (1971) – Professor, Florida State University, College of Criminology and Criminal Justice
- James Hanrahan (1952) – founding Chancellor, St. Thomas More School
- Edward Hardiman (1991) – Headmaster, St. John's Preparatory School (Massachusetts)
- Thomas M. Kelly – Head of School, Horace Mann School
- Kevin Kiernan (1967) – T. Marshall Hahn Sr. Professor of Arts and Sciences Emeritus, University of Kentucky
- Katherine Lapp (1978) – Executive Vice President of Harvard University
- Harry Marmion (1953) – President of Saint Xavier University, Stony Brook Southampton and United States Tennis Association
- David J. McCarthy, Jr. (1957) – Dean Emeritus, Georgetown University Law Center
- Bernard McGrane (1969) – Associate Professor of Sociology, Chapman University
- Robert J. McMahon (1971) – Ralph D. Mershon Professor of History, The Ohio State University
- Joseph Moylan (1960) – founding President, Durham Nativity School; professor of surgery, Duke University School of Medicine
- Maurice J. O'Sullivan (1966) – Kenneth Curry Chair of Literature, Rollins College
- Thomas Poon (1990) – President of Loyola Marymount University
- Donald Preziosi (1962) – leading art historian and author; Slade Professor of Fine Art, Oxford University; Professor Emeritus, UCLA
- Mark Reed (1996) – President of Loyola of Chicago University
- Charles E. Schaefer (1955) – "Father of Play Therapy"; Professor of Psychology, Fairleigh Dickinson University
- Kurt C. Schlichting (1970) – E. Gerald Corrigan Endowed Chair in the Humanities and Social Sciences, Fairfield University
- John Skoyles (1971) – poet and writer; Professor of Writing, Literature & Publishing, Emerson College

=== Business ===
- Michael Amalfitano (1979) – president and CEO, Embraer Executive Jets
- Michael G. Archbold (1975) – former CEO, Talbots, Vitamin Shoppe and GNC
- Logan Beirne (2005) – CEO, Matterhorne Transactions; 2014 William E. Colby Award winner
- Joseph Berardino (1972) – managing director, Alvarez & Marsal; former CEO, Arthur Andersen
- Joseph P. Brennan (1991) – Global Chief Risk Officer, The Vanguard Group
- Jeff Campbell (1965) – former CEO, Burger King; ex-chairman, Pillsbury Restaurant Group
- Carlos M. Cardoso (1980) – president and CEO, Kennametal; named a Best CEO by Institutional Investor Magazine
- Orlando P. Carvalho – Executive Vice President of the Aeronautics Division at Lockheed Martin
- David H. Chafey, Jr. (1976) – president, Banco Popular de Puerto Rico
- Susan Coffey (1986) – CEO, American Institute of Certified Public Accountants
- Timothy J. Conway (1976) – founder, chairman and CEO, NewStar Financial
- E. Gerald Corrigan (1963) – former president and CEO, Federal Reserve Bank of New York
- Bill Crager (1986) – founder and CEO, Envestnet
- Joseph DiMenna (1980) – co-founder of Zweig-DiMenna Associates
- Charles Dolan (2016) – founder of Cablevision and HBO
- William P. Egan (1967) – founder and general partner, Alta Communications and Marion Equity Partners
- Jorge Figueredo (1982) – executive vice president, McKesson Corporation; 100 "Most Influential Hispanics" by Hispanic Business
- John L. Flannery (1983) – chairman & CEO, General Electric
- Bob Galvin (1981) – CEO, Iconix Brand Group
- Judith E. Glaser – founder and CEO, Benchmark Communications
- Joseph E. Hasten (1974) – president and CEO, ShoreBank; former vice chairman, U.S. Bancorp
- George F. Keane (1955) – founder, Common Fund
- Joseph D. Macchia (1957) – founder and CEO, GAINSCO
- Shawn Matthews (1989) – CEO, Cantor Fitzgerald
- Christopher McCormick (1978) – president and CEO, L.L. Bean
- Jay McLauglin (1970) - co-founder of J.McLauglin
- Andrew McMahon (1989) – CEO, Guardian Life Insurance of America
- Kathleen Murphy (1984) – President of Fidelity Personal Investing; Fortune Magazine's 50 Most Powerful Women in Business
- Peter J. Pestillo (1960) – former chairman and CEO, Visteon
- Jennifer Piepszak (1992) – COO of JPMorgan Chase
- Rick Pych (1975) – president of business operations, San Antonio Spurs
- Leslie C. Quick Jr. (1999) – co-founder of Quick & Reilly
- Larry Rafferty (1964) – founder and CEO, Rafferty Capital Markets
- Steven C. Rockefeller, Jr. (1985) – chairman and CEO, Rose Rock Group
- Eileen Rominger (1976) – former global chief investment officer, Goldman Sachs Asset Management
- Ronan Ryan (1996) – president, Investor's Exchange; character in Michael Lewis’ best-seller, Flash Boys: A Wall Street Revolt
- Joseph D. Sargent (1959) – former president and CEO, Guardian Life Insurance Company of America
- Phil Singleton (1993) – author and founding CEO of Kansas City Web Design
- Julieann Thurlow (2000) - CEO, Reading Cooperative Bank and Chairman, American Bankers Association
- Marita Zuraitis (1974) – president and CEO, Horace Mann Educator Corporation

=== Journalism ===
- Rob Finnerty (2005) – news host on Newsmax
- Sonia Isabelle (1997) – Emmy Award-winning news anchor; host of Celebrity Page, a nationally syndicated TV magazine show
- Susan King (1973) – Emmy Award-winning TV news anchor; Dean, University of North Carolina School of Media and Journalism
- Kate McCulley (2005) - Adventurous Kate travel blogger
- Bill McDonald (1975) – Pulitzer Prize-winning New York Times editor
- Bob Sullivan (1990) – award-winning journalist, New York Times best-selling author; founding staff member, msnbc.com
- Carmen Wong Ulrich (1992) – personal finance journalist; host, CNBC's On the Money
- Liz Wahl (2008) – former Russia Today news anchor who quit on air for ethical reasons

=== Judges ===
- Sean Connelly (1980) – Colorado Court of Appeals Judge; Special Attorney to U.S. Attorneys General Ashcroft and Reno
- John A. Danaher III (1992) – Connecticut Superior Court Judge; 47th United States Attorney For the District of Connecticut
- Raymond J. Dearie (1966) – United States Foreign Intelligence Surveillance Court Judge
- Daniel J. Dinan (1952) – United States Tax Court Special Trial Judge
- Joseph P. Flynn (1962) – Connecticut Appellate Court Chief Judge
- William J. Lavery (1959) – Connecticut Appellate Court Chief Judge
- Steve Shannon (1993) – Circuit Court Judge in the 19th Judicial Circuit of Virginia

=== Law and government ===
- Stephen Buoniconti (1991) – former member of the Massachusetts General Court
- J. Edward Caldwell (1967) – former Comptroller of Connecticut
- Vincent Cianci (1962) – 32nd and 34th Mayor of Providence, Rhode Island
- Donald DeFronzo (1970) – former Connecticut State Senator
- Richard Morgan Downey (1968) – Obesity advocate
- John F. Fahey (1990) - State’s Attorney for the Judicial District of Windham (Connecticut)
- J. Michael Farren (1977) – former lawyer and bureaucrat
- Michael Fedele (1980) – 107th Lieutenant Governor of Connecticut
- C. Frank Figliuzzi (1987) – former assistant director of the Federal Bureau of Investigation Counterintelligence Division
- Brian J. Flaherty (1987) – former Connecticut State Representative
- Thomas J. Josefiak (1968) – former chairman of the Federal Election Commission
- Kevin C. Kelly (1985) – former Connecticut State Senator
- Martin Looney (1970) – President pro tempore of the Connecticut Senate
- Edward Mazurek (1968) – former Maine State Senate
- Thomas C. O'Connor (1955) – former Connecticut State Representative
- Leonard S. Paoletta (1956) – former Connecticut State Representative
- Jorge E. Pérez-Díaz (1977) – former Secretary of Justice and Solicitor General of Puerto Rico
- Chris Pilkerton (1995) – former administrator of the Small Business Administration
- Joseph Polletta (2011) - Connecticut State Representative
- J. Michael Quinlan (1963) – 5th Director of the Federal Bureau of Prisons
- Rosa Rebimbas (2004) – former Connecticut State Representative
- David Rothbard – former president of the Committee For A Constructive Tomorrow (CFACT)
- Joseph Russoniello (1963) – former U.S. Attorney for the Northern District of California
- Stefany Shaheen (D-NH), member-elect of the United States House of Representatives
- Charles E. Sova (1953) – former New Hampshire State Representative
- Thomas Spota (1980) – former district attorney of Suffolk County, New York
- Steven Stafstrom (2005) – former Connecticut State Representative
- Bob Stefanowski (1984) – Republican nominee for Governor of Connecticut in 2018 and 2022
- Nancy Vaughan (1981) – Mayor of Greensboro, North Carolina

=== Medicine and science ===
- James L. Abbruzzese (1974) – internationally recognized pancreatic cancer researcher at the Duke Cancer Institute
- David C. Christiani (1979) – Elkan Blout Professor of Environmental Health at Harvard T.H. Chan School of Public Health
- J. Kevin Dorsey (1964) – dean and provost of the Southern Illinois University School of Medicine
- Steven Flanagan (1984) – nationally renowned expert on Traumatic Brain Injuries at the Rusk Institute of Rehabilitation Medicine
- Tatiana Foroud (1987) – internationally recognized genetic researcher at the Indiana University School of Medicine
- Doris Troth Lippman – Vietnam Women's Memorial Vice-Chair; Honorary Purple Heart recipient
- John T. Lis (1970) – 2000 Guggenheim Fellow; Barbara McClintock Professor of Molecular Biology and Genetics at Cornell University
- Jean Malecki – Local Legend honoree by the National Library of Medicine
- Gregory J. Martin (1980) – Chief of Infectious Diseases, Bethesda Naval Hospital; U.S. Navy Legion of Merit recipient
- Brian Monahan (1980) – Attending Physician of the United States Congress; Rear Admiral in the United States Navy
- Caitlin O'Connell-Rodwell (1987) – world renowned elephant expert; instructor at Stanford University Medical School
- Peter Pronovost (1984) – 2008 MacArthur Fellow and one of Time magazine's 100 World's Most Influential People
- Richard Proto (1962) – noted cryptographer elected to the United States National Security Agency Hall of Honor
- Julio Ramirez (1977) – national leader in neuroscience education; R. Stuart Dickson Professor of Psychology at Davidson College
- Francis J. Tedesco (1965) – president emeritus, Medical College of Georgia

=== Social action and community service ===
- Tom Cornell (1956) – journalist and peace activist
- Michael Donnelly (1981) – leading activist for sufferers of Gulf War Syndrome; author of Falcon's Cry
- Paula Donovan (1977) – executive director, AIDS-Free World; Salem Award for Human Rights and Social Justice Foundation recipient
- G. Simon Harak (1970) – Director of the Center for Peacemaking at Marquette University
- Robin Bennett Kanarek (1996) – nurse, philanthropist, and author
- Stephen V. Kobasa (1969) – peace and political activist
- Robert J. Wicks (1968) – leading writer about the intersection of spirituality and psychology; Pro Ecclesia et Pontifice recipient

=== Baseball ===
- Keefe Cato (1979) – Major League Baseball player
- Austin Pope (2019) - Major League Baseball player

==== Basketball ====
- Maurice Barrow (2014) – professional basketball player
- Troy Bradford (1989) – professional basketball player; 3x 1st Team Small American
- Ajou Deng (2003) – professional basketball player; member of the Great Britain national basketball team
- Joe DeSantis (1979) – All-American and professional basketball player
- Tricia Fabbri (1991) – women's college basketball coach
- Kathy Fedorjaka (1990) – women's college basketball coach
- Greg Francis (1997) – Canadian Olympic basketball player and Junior National Men's basketball coach
- Deng Gai (2005) – professional basketball player; 2005 NCAA Division I blocks leader
- Marcus Gilbert (2016) – professional basketball player
- Pete Gillen (1968) – college basketball analyst and men's basketball coach
- Drew Henderson (1993) – professional basketball player; member of the Dutch national basketball team
- Art Kenny (1968) – professional basketball player; No. 18 retired by Olimpia Milano
- Scott King (2016) - head coach of NBA G League Austin Spurs
- Nick Macarchuk (1963) – men's college basketball coach
- Luke Murray (2007) - men's college basketball coach
- Derek Needham (2013) – professional basketball player; member of the Montenegro national basketball team
- Tyler Nelson (2018) – professional basketball player
- Tim O'Toole (1988) – men's college basketball coach
- Darren Phillip (2000) – professional basketball player; 2000 NCAA Division I rebounding leader
- Rakim Sanders (2012) – professional basketball player; 2x Italian League champion
- Lou Lopez Sénéchal (2022) – Mexican-French professional basketball player
- Brendan Suhr (1979) – men's college basketball coach
- Robert Thomson (2004) – professional basketball player in Europe; member of the Rwanda national basketball team
- Keith Urgo (2002) – men's college basketball coach
- A. J. Wynder (1987) – National Basketball Association player
- Mark Young (1979) – professional basketball player

==== Lacrosse ====
- Brent Adams (2012) – All-American, Major League Lacrosse All-Star and Team USA midfielder
- Mike Bocklet (2007) – Major League Lacrosse All-Star attackman
- Greg Downing (2007) – All-American, Major League Lacrosse All-Star and Team USA midfielder
- C.J. Kemp (2003) – All-American and Major League Lacrosse goalkeeper
- Joe Marra (2010) – Major League Lacrosse All-Star goalkeeper
- Jack Murphy (2015) – Major League Lacrosse goalkeeper
- TJ Neubauer (2016) – All-American and Major League Lacrosse midfielder
- Peter Vlahakis (2004) – All-American and Major League Lacrosse All-Star face-off midfielder

==== Soccer ====
- Abby Allan (2001) – New Zealand national football player
- Adam Braz (2001) – Technical Director, Montreal Impact; Canadian international and Major League Soccer player
- Robyn Decker (2008) – professional football player
- Jonathan Filipe (2021) – professional soccer player
- Bryan Harkin (2001) – United Soccer League player
- Mark Longwell (1982) – U.S. international and United Soccer League player
- Brett Maron (2008) – National Women's Soccer League player
- Jim McElderry (1993) – Rutgers University men's soccer coach and United Soccer League player
- Michael O'Keeffe (2013) – New Zealand national football and 2014 Olympic player
- Nikki Stanton (2013) – National Women's Soccer League player
- Justin Thompson (2003) – Canadian international and professional soccer player
- Matt Turner (2015) – United States men's national soccer team and Premier League football player
- Matthew Uy (2010) – Philippines national football player

==== Other ====
- Will Brazier (2005) – All-American, U.S. international and Super League rugby player
- Evan Centopani (2004) – professional bodybuilder
- Paul Sheehy (1985) – U.S. international and Super League rugby player
- Laura Valentino (2013) – head coach of the UConn Huskies softball team

== Notable Faculty ==
- Peter Michael Gish
