= Archbold =

Archbold may refer to:

== People ==
- Anne Mills Archbold (1873–1968), American heiress, big game hunter and philanthropist
- Barry Archbold (born 1933), Australian rules footballer
- Darin Archbold (born 1969), American basketball player
- Jo Archbold, model
- John Archbold (disambiguation), several people
- Michael G. Archbold, American businessman
- Ralph Archbold (1942–2017), historical impersonator of Benjamin Franklin
- Richard Archbold (1907–1976), American zoologist, grandson of John Dustin Archbold
- Shane Archbold (born 1989), New Zealand professional racing cyclist
- Thomas Archbold (died after 1488), Irish Crown official, lawyer and judge

== Places ==
- Archbold, Ohio, village in Fulton County, Ohio, United States
  - Archbold High School, public high school in Archbold, Ohio, United States
- Archbold Biological Station, Lake Placid, FL, USA, founded by Richard Archbold
- Archbold Gymnasium, gymnasium located on the campus of Syracuse University, New York, United States, named after John Dustin Archbold
- Archbold Stadium, former multi-purpose stadium in Syracuse, New York, United States, named after John Dustin Archbold

== Other ==
- Archbold's bowerbird (Archboldia papuensis), bowerbird named after Richard Archbold
- Archbold Criminal Pleading, Evidence and Practice, leading practitioners' text for criminal lawyers in various common law jurisdictions around the world

== See also ==
- Archibald (disambiguation)
