= Tedeschi (surname) =

Tedeschi is a surname, derived from an Italian word for "German". Notable people with the name include:

- Art Tedeschi, drummer of The Frustrators
- Carla Gilberta Bruni Tedeschi (born 1967), known as Carla Bruni, Italian songwriter, singer, model
- Enzo Tedeschi (born 1976), Australian film producer
- Ettore Gotti Tedeschi (born 1945), Italian economist and banker
- Gad Tedeschi (1907–1992), Israeli jurist
- Giacomo Radini-Tedeschi (1857–1914), Catholic bishop
- Gianrico Tedeschi (1920–2020), Italian film actor
- Luca Tedeschi (born 1987), Italian footballer
- Marco Tedeschi (1817–1869), Italian rabbi and poet
- Mark Tedeschi (born 1952), Australian barrister and photographer, father of Simon
- Marzia Tedeschi (born 1976), Italian actress
- Mirko Tedeschi (cyclist, born 1987), Italian cyclist
- Mirko Tedeschi (cyclist, born 1989), Italian cyclist
- Nadir Tedeschi (1930–2021), Italian politician
- Richard Tedeschi (born 1943), American psychologist
- Simon Tedeschi (born 1981), Australian classical pianist and writer, son of Mark
- Susan Tedeschi (born 1970), American blues and soul musician
  - Tedeschi Trucks Band, a band led by Susan Tedeschi and Derek Trucks
- Tony Tedeschi (born 1964), American pornographic movie actor
- Valeria Bruni Tedeschi (born 1964), Italian-French actress, sister of Carla

== See also ==
- Tedesco (surname)
