= Joseph Sargent (disambiguation) =

Joseph Sargent (1925–2014)), an American film director and actor

Joseph Sargent may also refer to:

- Joseph B. Sargent (1822–1907), American politician and hardware manufacturer
- Joseph D. Sargent (1937–2016), American insurance executive
- Joe Sargent (1893–1950), baseball player
- Joe Sargent, minor character in H. P. Lovecraft's 1936 novella The Shadow over Innsmouth
