= Tedeschi =

Tedeschi may refer to:

- Tedeschi (surname), including a list of people with the name
- Fondaco dei Tedeschi, historic building in Venice
- San Giorgio ai Tedeschi, church in Pisa
- Tedeschi E.T.186, Italian glider plane
- Tedeschi Food Shops, American chain of convenience stores

== See also ==
- Tedesco (disambiguation)
