= Jantsch =

Jantsch is a surname. Notable people with the surname include:

- Carol Jantsch (born 1985), American classical tubist
- Erich Jantsch (1929–1980), Austrian system-theorist, astrophysicist, engineer, educator, writer, consultant and futurist
- John Jantsch (born 1960), American writer, speaker and business consultant
