= Trumbull High School =

Coordinates: 41.2645°N 73.1922°W

Location
- 72 Strobel Road; Trumbull, Fairfield County, Connecticut 06611; United States

Information
- School type: Public high school
- Established: 1969 (57 years ago)
- School district: Trumbull School District
- Superintendent: Martin Semmel
- CEEB code: 070800
- Principal: Todd Manuel
- Teaching staff: 146.00 (FTE)
- Grades: 9–12
- Enrollment: 2,155 (2023–2024)
- Student to teacher ratio: 14.76
- Language: English
- Colors: Gold, black
- Mascot: Eagle
- Website: ths.trumbullps.org

Trumbull High School is a large public high school located in Trumbull, Connecticut. The current principal is Todd Manuel.

== History ==
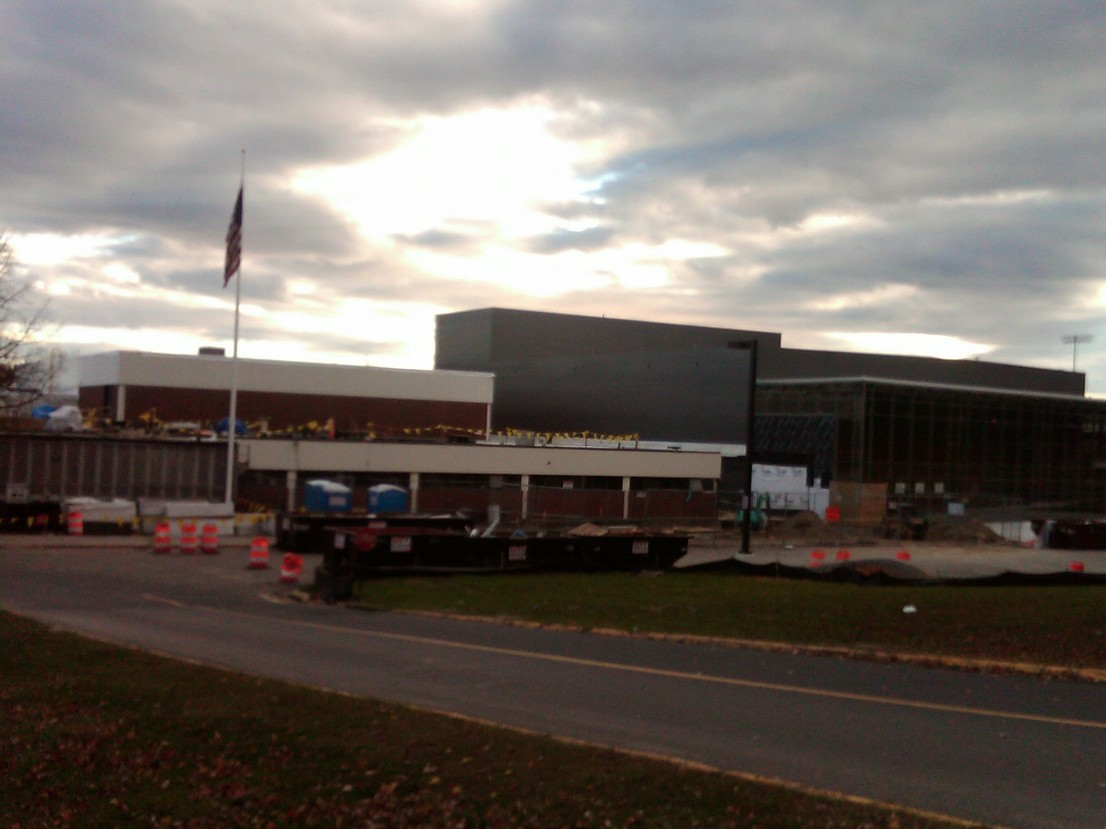
Front of Trumbull High School (under construction)

Trumbull High School was founded in 1961 following a population increase in Trumbull during the 1950s. It was originally located at 4630 Madison Avenue, in the building currently serving as Madison Middle School. As the 1960s progressed, the town was compelled to commission a new high school to accommodate further population growth.

In 1971 a new school was constructed at 72 Strobel Road, offering a then-modern auditorium (originally designed as a lecture hall), two-story media center, and athletic complex. Middlebrook Junior High School was converted to Middlebrook Elementary School, and the Madison Avenue complex was converted to Madison Junior High School.

Trumbull High School housed grades 10–12 until 1987–1988 when ninth-graders were moved to the high school, and sixth-graders were moved to the Madison and Hillcrest middle schools.

In 1999, Trumbull High School was on national news due to a violent hazing incident involving 10 students of the wrestling team beating, hog-tying, and sodomizing a special-needs student.

== Facilities ==
=== Academic ===
The main building contains two floors of classrooms, labs, and offices. It can take as much as 5 minutes to cross the interior of the main building.

An Agriscience and Biotechnology building is located on campus and contains classrooms, labs, a greenhouse, as well as a working farm.

=== Athletic ===
The school has an American football field known as McDougal stadium. It also hosts 6 tennis courts, 5 baseball and softball fields, and joint soccer and lacrosse stadium.

== Sports ==
Wins in CIAC State Championships
Sport	Class	Year(s)
Baseball	LL	1986, 1998
Basketball (girls)	L	1974
Cross country (girls)	LL	1999
Football	LL	1977
Football	L-I	1985, 1986
Field Hockey	L	1986
Gymnastics (girls)	L	2024, 2025, 2026
Gymnastics (girls)	Open	2024, 2025, 2026
Ice Hockey (boys)	II	2012
Lacrosse (boys)	II	2005
Soccer (girls)	L	1996, 1997, 1998, 1999
Soccer (girls)	LL	2001, 2006 (Co-champions with Amity), 2007, 2008
Softball	LL	2017
Track and field (indoor, boys)	L	2000
Track and field (indoor, boys)	Open	2000
Volleyball (girls)	LL	2019
Wrestling (boys)	LL	2023
Wrestling (girls)	n/a	2025, 2026

== Achievements ==
=== Marching band ===
- MAC Class IV Champions 2001, 2003; Class V Champions 2006, 2007, 2010, 2011, 2015
- United States Presidential Inaugural Parade – 2001, 2009
- MAC Scholastic Marching Open Winter Percussion Champions 2008, 2018
- WGI Percussion World Championships SO Finalists 2006, 2007, 2008, 2009, 2010, 2011, 2012, 2013, 2014, 2015, 2016, 2017, 2018,2019
- WGI Percussion World Championships SO Finalists – Silver Medalists 2008, 2009
- WGI Colorguard World Championships SW Finalists 2007, 2009, 2010, 2011, 2012, 2013, 2014, 2015, 2017, 2018
- WGI Colorguard World Championships SO Class Bronze Medalists 2006, SW Class Silver Medalists 2018
- EMBA Class III Gold Division Champions 2000
- 1997 Bands Of America – Division AA Class Champions
- 2016 Bands Of America – Division AAA Class Champions
- 2016 Bands Of America – Regional Champions
- 1997, 2017 Macy's Thanksgiving Day Parade
- 1996, 1997, 1998, 1999 EMBA Class V runner up
- 1992, 1994, 1995 EMBA Class IV Champions
- 2015 USBands – Class 6 Open Third place Nationals
- 2016 USBands – Class 6 Open National Champions
- 2017 USBands – Class 6 Open Second place Nationals

=== Other ===
- American Scholastic Press Association "Most Outstanding High School Yearbook" 2004, 2005
- We the People Connecticut State Champions (1988, 1991, 1992, 1994–1997, 1999–2007, 2012–2019, 2022, 2023)
- We the People Top Ten in the Nation (2003, 2005, 2007, 2013, 2016, 2022, 2023) Best in Northeast (1992, 2002, 2006, 2012, 2015, 2019)
- Math Team – Connecticut State Champions(2005), Top Ten in New England (2005, 2006)

== Notable alumni ==
- Paul Catanese – author
- Roger Friedman (1975) – gossip columnist, fired by Fox News
- Tony Horton (1976) – exercise instructor best known for P90X
- Mark Longwell (1978) – All-New England soccer player at Fairfield University who went on to compete for the US men's national soccer team and Tampa Bay Rowdies
- Harold Jensen (1983) – player on Villanova University's 1985 NCAA championship basketball team, who played a key role in the championship game versus Georgetown
- Craig Breslow (1998) – professional baseball pitcher for the Cleveland Indians, Boston Red Sox, Minnesota Twins, Oakland A's, San Diego Padres, Arizona Diamondbacks, and Miami Marlins; Assistant general manager/Vice President, Pitching for the Chicago Cubs, Chief Baseball Officer for the Red Sox
- Jamie D'Antona (2001) – former MLB player for the Arizona Diamondbacks
- Manya Makoski (2002) – professional soccer player for the Los Angeles Sol, Atlanta Beat, and Sky Blue FC.
