= Terrestrial Energy =

Nuclear technology company developing the Integral Molten Salt Reactor

- Type: Public
- Traded as: Nasdaq: IMSR
- Industry: Small modular reactor
- Founded: 2013; 13 years ago
- Founders: Simon Irish, David LeBlanc
- Headquarters: Charlotte, North Carolina, United States
- Key people: Simon Irish (CEO); David LeBlanc (CTO, President)
- Website: terrestrialenergy.com

Terrestrial Energy is an American nuclear technology company working on Generation IV nuclear technology. Founded in 2013, the company is developing an Integral Molten Salt Reactor (IMSR) for commercial use. Its headquarters are in Charlotte, North Carolina. It went public on the Nasdaq in October 2025.

== History ==
=== 2013-2022 ===
Terrestrial Energy was founded in 2013 in Canada by Simon Irish, a former investment manager, and by David LeBlanc, a former Carleton University professor and expert in molten-salt reactor technology. Simon Irish became CEO, while LeBlanc became chief technology officer. The company focused on developing designs and technology for an integral molten salt reactor (IMSR).

In 2016, Terrestrial Energy began a pre-licensing vendor design review for the IMSR with the Canadian Nuclear Safety Commission and successfully completed the first stage in late 2017. By late 2017, it was in talks with the Canadian government to potentially secure the Canadian National Labs in Chalk River, Ontario as the location of its first plant. The company had what the Globe & Mail called a setback in late 2021, when Ontario Power Generation chose GE Hitachi Nuclear Energy over Terrestrial Energy to build a small modular reactor at Darlington Nuclear Generating Station.

=== 2023-2024 ===
In April 2023, the company completed the second stage of the Canadian Nuclear Safety Commission vendor design review, the first high-temperature advanced reactor to do so. It was the first IMSR and the second MSR to complete the process, allowing Terrestrial Energy to begin working towards a commercial license of an IMSR plant. Shortly afterwards, in May 2023, the US Department of Energy (DOE) gave Terrestrial Energy a grant to support the progression of its proposal through the Nuclear Regulatory Commission licensing program. In August 2023, the company signed a contract with Springfields Fuels, a subsidiary of Westinghouse, to design and construct an IMSR fuel pilot plant at a Springfields facility in the UK. It then agreed to work with the Emirates Nuclear Energy Corporation in December 2023 on deploying IMSR in the UAE.

In 2024, Terrestrial Energy established its headquarters in Charlotte, North Carolina. In December 2024, the company signed a memorandum of understanding (MOU) with EnergySolutions to evaluate decommissioned nuclear sites as possible IMSR deployment sites. Also in 2024, it signed a MOU with Zachry Group to support IMSR site evaluation, as well as a MOU with Schneider Electric to "integrate IMSR plants into industrial power systems." It joined the Texas Nuclear Alliance (TNA) in June 2024. That month, it also tapped the Pacific Northwest National Laboratory (PNNL) to "analyze the performance of IMSR fuel salts."

=== 2025-2026 ===
After a pre-licensing process, in 2025, the Nuclear Regulatory Commission (NRC) approved the "principal design criteria" for Terrestrial Energy's IMSR, in what was the first safety ruling by the NRC for molten salt reactor technology. In February 2025, it was one of four reactor developers selected by Texas A&M University System for site construction and operation of small modular reactor plants (SMRs) at the Texas A&M-RELLIS campus near College Station.

Donald Trump signed an executive order in May 2025 directing the DOE launch an accelerated Reactor Pilot Program. Ten nuclear developers were selected, including Terrestrial Energy, to construct pilot reactor projects with an expedited timeline. In July 2025, the DOE then selected Terrestrial Energy as one of four companies to be part of its Fuel Line Pilot Program, supporting the development of fuel fabrication capacity. By October 2025, the company was focused on the US market, with its first commercial project planned for the Texas A&M RELLIS Campus. It aimed to have reactors in the market by the early 2030s. In June 2026, 77 acres on the A&M RELLIS site were set aside for development.

It merged with HCM II Acquisition Corp., a special-purpose acquisition company (SPAC), on October 28, 2025. The following day, the merged entity became publicly traded on the Nasdaq, with Terrestrial Energy's equity value at $925 million. On January 6, 2026, it announced that the DOE was supporting its Project TETRA, an initiative to construct and operate a pilot reactor, as well as TEFLA, a fuel production line project. In May 2026, Terrestrial Energy and Riot Platforms agreed to collaborate on future data centers powered by IMSR Plants. Operating from its headquarters in Charlotte, North Carolina, Terrestrial Energy has ongoing projects with national labs and institutions such as the Texas A&M University, Westinghouse, Ameresco, Energy Solutions, Siemens, Idaho National Laboratory, Oakridge National Laboratory, and Argonne National Laboratory.

== Key people ==
As of 2026, among Terrestrial Energy's executives were CEO Simon Irish, COO William Smith, CTO David LeBlanc, and CFO Brian Thrasher. Members of the board included chairman Frederick Buckman, David Hill, Robert W. Jones, Charles Pardee, Simon Irish, David LeBlanc, Hugh MacDiarmid, former Pacific Gas & Electric Company CEO William D. Johnson, and former Cantor Fitzgerald CEO Shawn Matthews.

The company for years convened an industrial advisory board, with representatives from entities such as Caterpillar Inc., Bruce Power, Engie, NextEra Energy, the Tennessee Valley Authority, Southern Nuclear Operating Company, Ontario Power Generation, Public Service Enterprise Group and Energy Northwest.

== Reactor design ==
Terrestrial Energy is developing the Integral Molten Salt Reactor (IMSR) for commercial use. Using fission technology and classified as Generation IV nuclear reactor technology, molten salt reactors use a blend of fluoride salt that includes uranium tetrafluoride as a fuel component. This blend functions both as reactor fuel and its coolant, unlike older reactors that use solid fuel and a separate coolant.

Drawing from reactors prototyped by the Oak Ridge National Laboratory, the IMSR plant under development by Terrestrial Energy is designed to produce 822 MWth (390 MWe) for power generation and industrial heat applications, supplying heat for commercial use at 585 degrees Celsius. Beyond electrical generation, this high-temperature thermal output could, according to the company, be used for industrial heat applications, including chemical and petrochemical production, and hydrogen and ammonia production.

== See also ==
- List of small modular reactor designs
