= Archibald =

Archibald may refer to:

== People and fictional characters ==
- Archibald (name), including lists of people and fictional characters with the given name or surname
- Archibald (musician), stage name of American R&B musician Leon Gross (1916–1973)
- Archibald, a pen name of Polish writer Waldemar Łysiak (born 1944)

== Other uses ==
- Archibald, Louisiana, a community in the United States
- Archibald Prize, an Australian portraiture art prize for painting
- Archibald Lake Wilderness Area, a wilderness area in Nova Scotia

== See also ==
- Archibald House, several buildings
- Archie (disambiguation)
- Archbold (disambiguation)
- Giuseppe Arcimboldo (1527–1593), Italian painter
