= Tedesco =

Tedesco (Italian for "German") may refer to:

- 2882 Tedesco, main-belt asteroid
- Tedesco gin, a variant of gin rummy
- Fondaco dei Tedeschi, headquarters and restricted living quarters of the German merchant population in Venice
- Germans, an ethnic group native to Germany
- The German language, a West Germanic language spoken in Germany, Austria, Switzerland, Liechtenstein, Belgium, Luxembourg, South Tyrol, Lorraine, and Alsace
- Tedesco (surname)
- Uva Tedesco, synonym for the Italian wine grape Marzemino
