= Harald Jensen =

Harald Jensen may refer to:

- Harald Jensen (sport shooter), Norwegian sport shooter
- Harald Jensen (geologist), Australian geologist

== See also ==
- Harold Jensen, American basketball player
