= Phil Singleton =

American author, web designer and Internet marketing consultant

- Died: May 23, 2025
- Education: Fairfield University, B.A. Thunderbird School of Global Management, M.B.A.
- Occupations: Author, web designer and Internet marketing consultant
- Known for: Founding CEO of Kansas City Web Design
- Notable work: SEO for Growth and The Small Business Owner’s Guide To Local Lead Generation, The Small Business Owner's Guide To Local Lead Generation

Phil Singleton (died May 23, 2025) was an American author, web designer and Internet marketing consultant who assisted small businesses. He is the co-author of SEO for Growth and The Small Business Owner’s Guide To Local Lead Generation.

== Education ==
Singleton graduated with a B.S. in finance from Fairfield University Dolan School of Business in 1993 and an MBA from Thunderbird School of Global Management in 1999.

== Career ==
Singleton was the founder and CEO of Kansas City Web Design; a web design and development agency, and Kansas City SEO; an Internet marketing agency.

=== As an author ===
In 2015, Singleton co-wrote and co-published The Small Business Owner’s Guide To Local Lead Generation: Proven Strategies & Tips To Grow Your Business! with Ray L. Perry, Justin Sturges, Kevin Jordan and Mark Z. Fortune. The book covers the basics of marketing strategy, and marketing tactics such as referral marketing, direct mail and email marketing, and Internet marketing. The book was reviewed positively by Small Business Trends and won the organization's “2016 Small Business Book Award”.

In 2016, Singleton co-wrote and co-published SEO for Growth: The Ultimate Guide for Marketers, Web Designers & Entrepreneurs with John Jantsch. Brian Clark of Copyblogger wrote the book's foreword. The book covers the evolution of search engine optimization, and outlines a holistic approach to SEO and inbound marketing that includes web design, content marketing, social media marketing and reputation management.

In 2017, Mashable placed SEO for Growth #3 on its list of “10 marketing books to read in 2017”. Oracle placed the book #9 on its list of “Top 15 Marketing Books of 2016” and The Huffington Post placed the book #6 on its list of the “10 Best Marketing Books for Small Business Owners”. Inc. included SEO for Growth on its list of “41 Must-Read Books to Boost Your Social Media Skills”. The book was named the top search engine optimization book of 2017 by BrightEdge and BloggerLocal. Excerpts of the book have appeared on MSNBC, and notably received positive comments from Brian Halligan.

== Bibliography ==
- Phil Singleton; John Jantsch, SEO for Growth. ISBN 0692769447
- Phil Singleton; Ray L. Perry; Mark Z. Fortune, Kevin Jordan; Justin Sturges, The Small Business Owner's Guide To Local Lead Generation. ISBN 1514280574
