= Dotty Lynch =

- Born: Dorothea Jean Lynch; July 24, 1945; Brooklyn, New York, US
- Died: August 10, 2014 (aged 69); Washington, DC
- Education: Marymount Manhattan College, Fordham University
- Occupations: Political analyst, academic
- Known for: First female chief polltaker for a US presidential campaign
- Spouse: Richard Morgan Downey

Dotty Lynch (July 24, 1945 – August 10, 2014) was an American academic, journalist and political pollster, best known for being the first woman to be chief polltaker for a presidential campaign when she worked for Gary Hart. She also served as political advisor to George McGovern and Jimmy Carter.

She was the CBS News senior political editor from 1985 to 2005 and was a member of the CBS News/New York Times polling consortium.

In 2006, she joined American University's School of Communication as executive in residence, and became director of the SOC/SPA joint MA program in Political Communication.

== Career ==
Lynch began her career in 1968 when she worked as a researcher for the Election Unit at NBC. In 1972, she joined Cambridge Survey Research, becoming a vice president in 1976.

== Death ==
Lynch died August 10, 2014, from complications of melanoma. She is survived by her husband R. Morgan Downey and stepson Robert.
