= Ben O'Keeffe =

NZ rugby union referee

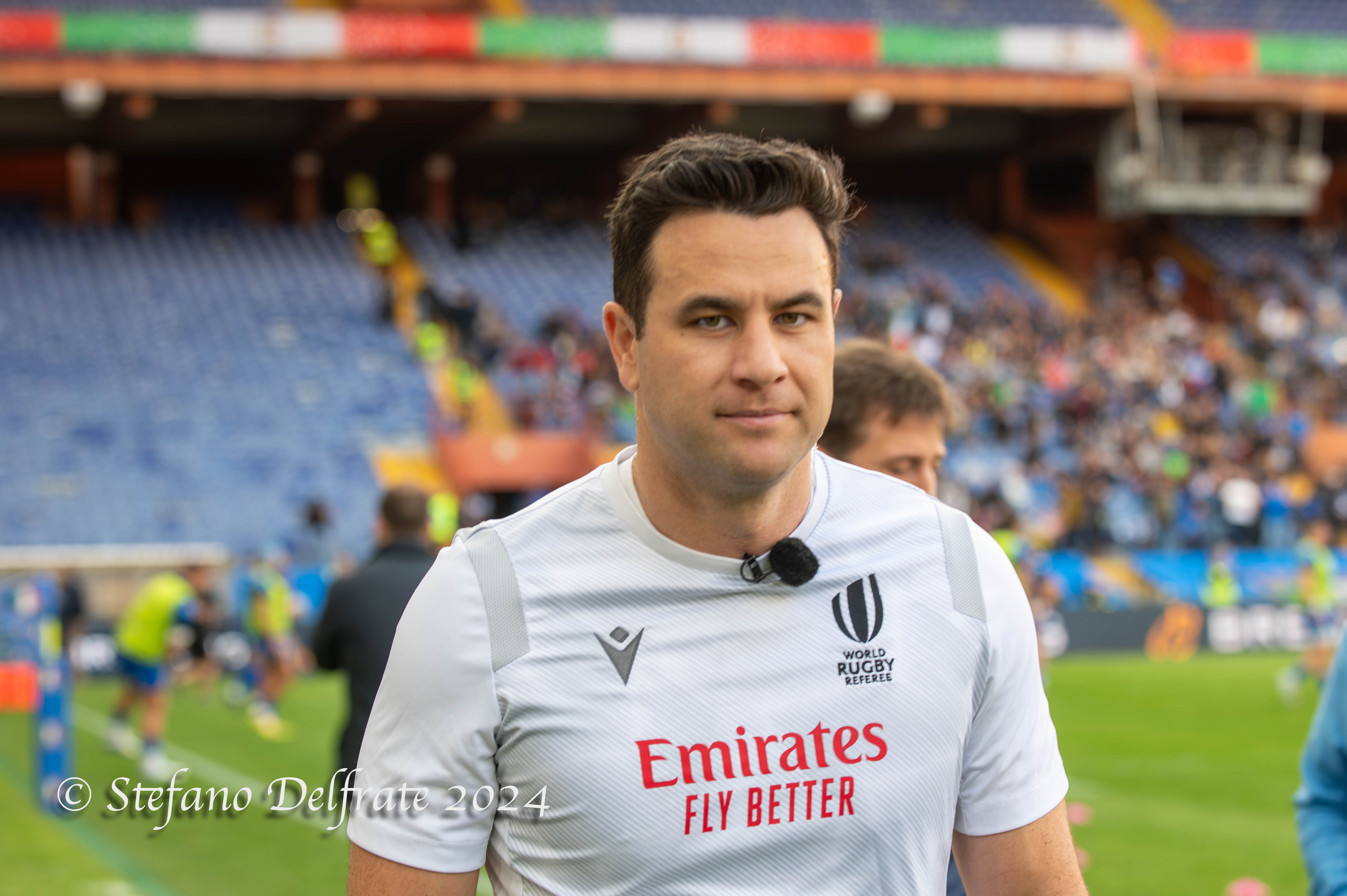
- O'Keeffe during the Autumn Nation Series 2024
- School: Marlborough Boys' College
- University: University of Otago
- Notable relative: Michael O'Keeffe (brother)
- Occupation: Professional rugby referee

Rugby union career
Refereeing career
Years	Competition	Apps
2013–	NPC	79
2014	Junior World Championship	4
2015–	Super Rugby	122
2016–	Test matches	61
2019–2023	Rugby World Cup	8
2021-2025	British and Irish Lions Series	2
2023	Top 14	2

Ben O'Keeffe is a rugby union referee from New Zealand. He currently referees at domestic, Super Rugby and test match level and holds the record for most first-class games, Super Rugby and test matches officiated by a New Zealand referee.

== Domestic career ==
O'Keeffe became a professional referee for the New Zealand Rugby Union (NZRU) in 2013 having started officiating in 2008 at the age of 19.

In 2014, he started to appear at Super Rugby level as an assistant referee, before going on to be selected by World Rugby for the 2014 IRB Junior World Championship.

He continued to referee at domestic level that year, before being selected for the 2015 Super Rugby season on 27 January 2015. He made his debut during the second round of the tournament, taking charge of the Highlanders vs Crusaders clash on 21 February as a late call up for injured referee Chris Pollock.

After the 2023 Super Rugby Final he came under severe social media criticism which included death threats in which he posted a public statement against. This was well received and supported by numerous rugby organisations including New Zealand Rugby.

He was recipient of New Zealand Referee of the year awards in 2018, 2021, 2022, 2023 and 2024.

On January 28, 2023, he made his first referee appearance in Top 14 match between Racing 92 and Stade Rochelais.

== International career ==
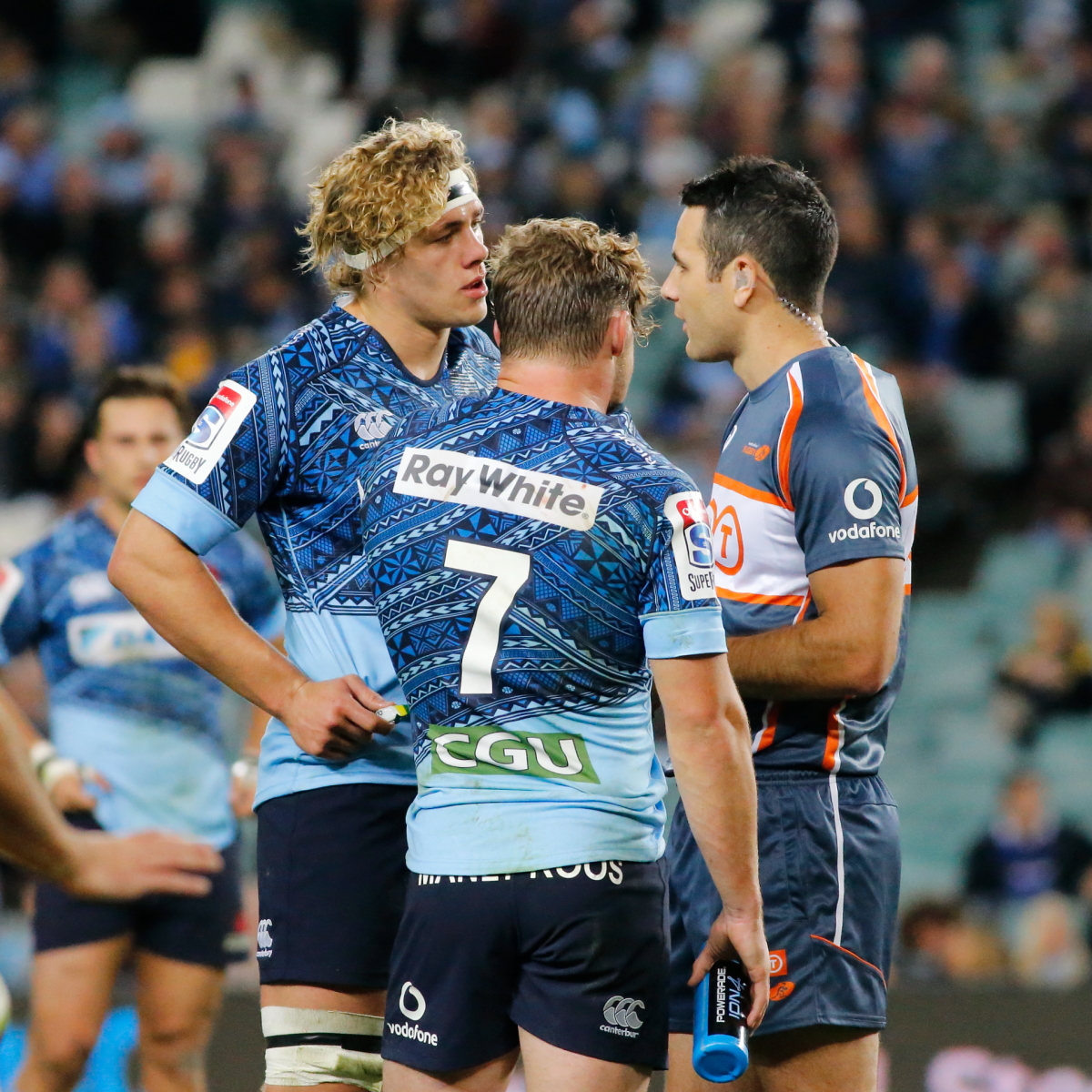
O'Keeffe during the 2017 Super Rugby competition

In 2016, O'Keeffe made his Six Nations Championship debut on 7 February as assistant referee in the Ireland vs Wales match, then Italy vs England the following weekend.

He was selected as the youngest referee at the 2019 Rugby World Cup in Japan and went on to referee three pool play games as well as assistant referee in the knock out stages. He was widely praised for his handling in the final pool match of the tournament; the historic 28-21 win by host nations Japan over Scotland.

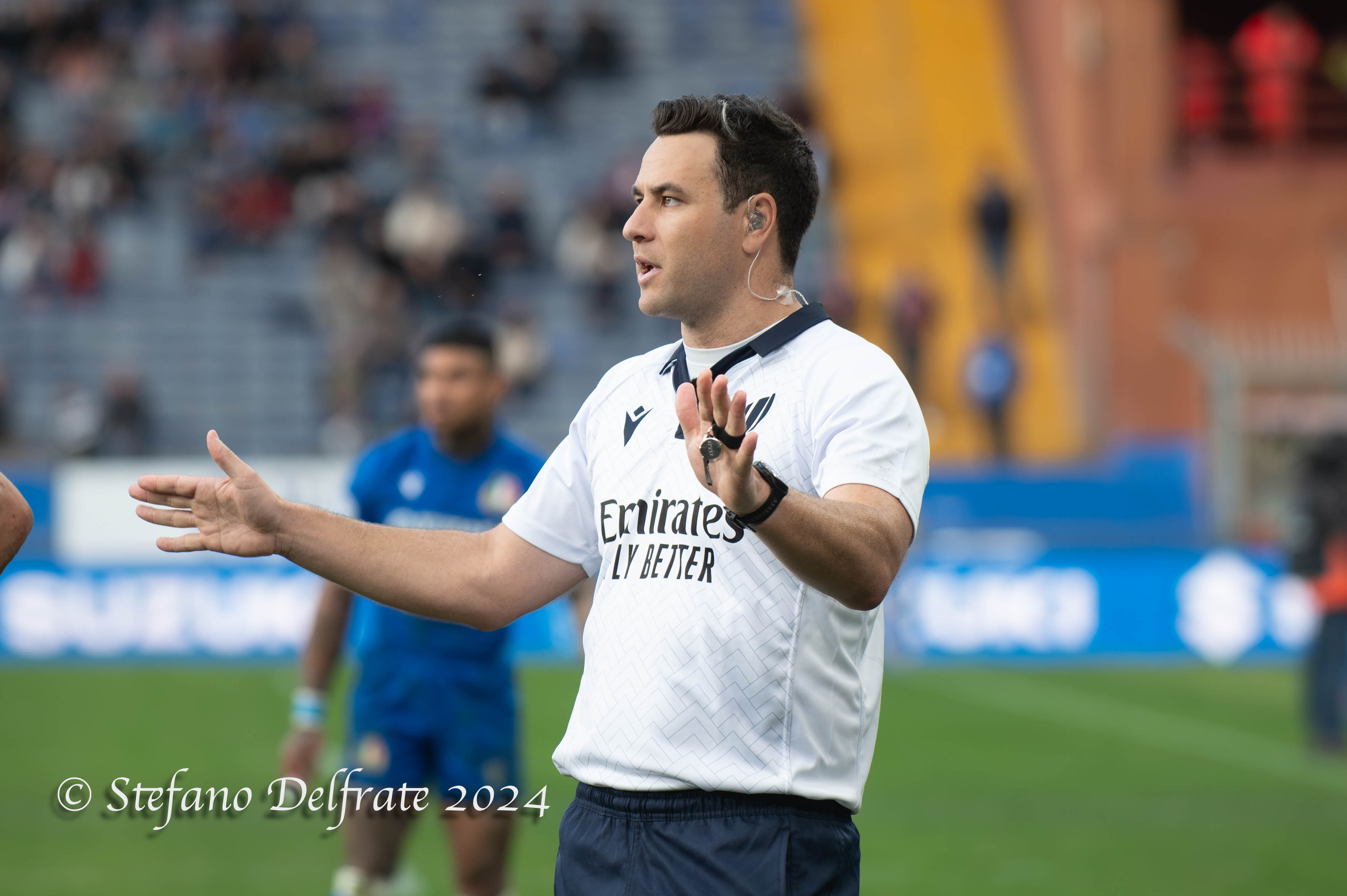
O'Keeffe in action in the Autumn Nations Cup

O'Keeffe was selected to referee the second test of the British and Irish Lions' tour of South Africa in 2021.

He refereed his 50th and record test match in the 2025 6 Nations fixture between Ireland and England.

== Personal life ==
O'Keeffe attended Marlborough Boys' College where he was head boy in 2006.

O'Keeffe's brother, Michael O'Keeffe, represented New Zealand at the 2012 London Olympics in football.
