= P. W. Catanese =

American writer

Paul Catanese
- Born: New York
- Occupations: Writer, Advertising
- Writing career
- Pen name: P. W. Catanese
- Genre: Children's fiction
- Notable work: Books of Umber
- Website: pwcatanese.com

Paul Catanese is an American author and advertising writer that writes under the pseudonym P. W. Catanese. Catanese is best known for his Books of Umber series, which has been mostly well received. As a teenager, Catanese attended Trumbull High School in Trumbull, Connecticut, later attending the University of Connecticut and taking a job with an advertising company in Glastonbury, Connecticut.

== Bibliography ==
=== Books of Umber ===
- Happenstance Found (2006)
- Dragon Games (2009)
- The End of Time (2010)

=== Further Tales Adventures ===
- The Brave Apprentice (2004)
- The Eye of the Warlock (2004)
- The Thief and the Beanstalk (2005)
- The Mirror’s Tale (2005)
- The Riddle of the Gnome (2006)
