= Carl Rees =

English football player and coach

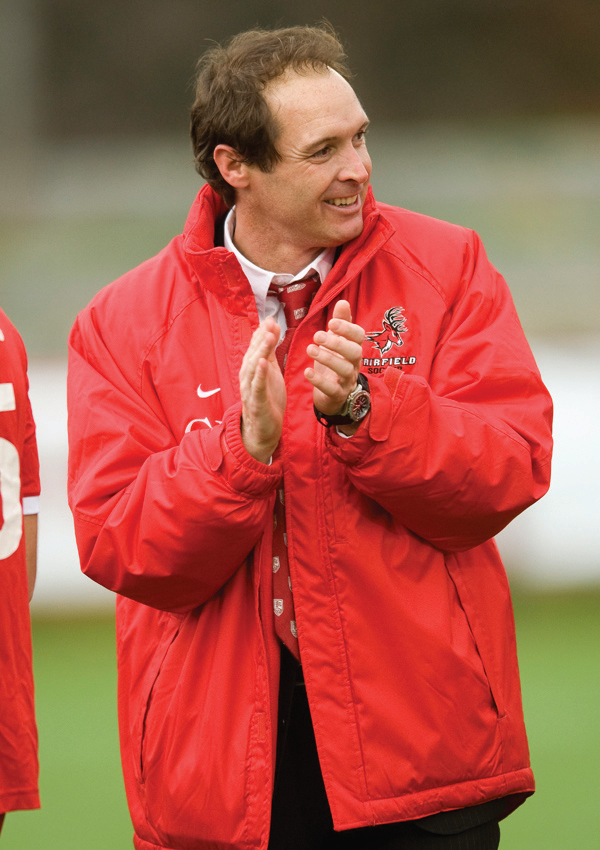

Biographical details
- Born: Oldham, England
- Education: Hartwick, B.A. Frostburg State, MEd.

Playing career
- 1984–1987: Hartwick
- 1988–1989: Albany Capitals
- 1995: Albany Alleycats
- Positions: Defender (college); Forward (professional)

Coaching career (HC unless noted)
- 1990: Plattsburgh State (assistant)
- 1991: Frostburg State (assistant)
- 1992–1996: Hartwick (assistant)
- 1996–2023: Fairfield

Accomplishments and honors

Awards
- Hartwick College Athletic Hall of Fame ('08); NSCAA New England Coach of the Year ('98); MAAC Coach of the Year ('98, '11); NSCAA All-Region ('84, '85); Soccer America All-Freshman ('84); FIFA Technical Report World Cup ('94)

Carl Rees is an English football manager who spent most of his managerial career managing the men's soccer program at Fairfield University, where he managed the team from 1996 until 2023.

Prior to being the Fairfield manager, Rees serves as an assistant for Hartwick College, Frostburg State University, and SUNY Plattsburgh. As manager, Rees earned several accolades including the 1998 NSCAA New England Coach of the Year and the 1998, 2011 and 2017 MAAC Coach of the Year.

== Player ==
Rees grew up in England and played for the Everton and Liverpool Football Club youth teams. In 1984, he moved to the United States to attend Hartwick College where he played on the school's soccer team. In 1984, he earned All-Freshman honors from Soccer America. After playing three years as a defender, Rees made the transition to forward and led the team with 10 goals and 24 points. He scored 24 goals and tallied 13 assists during his career. He was a two-time NSCAA All-Region honoree and a member of two Hartwick Final Four men's soccer teams (1984 and 1985). Over his four-year college career, Hartwick compiled a 53–20–7 record and went to four NCAA post-season tournaments. Rees was team captain as a junior and as a senior season. He graduated in 1988 and was inducted into the Hartwick Hall of Fame in June 2008.

In 1988, Rees signed with the Albany Capitals of the American Soccer League. He spent two seasons with the Capitals.

== Coach ==
Rees spent four seasons as an assistant coach under Jim Lennox at Hartwick College. During his four seasons, the Hawks posted better than 50 wins and advanced to the NCAA tournament, reaching the national quarterfinals in 1993. He also served as an assistant coach at Plattsburgh State and Frostburg State University.

On 26 March 1996, Rees was named head coach of the Fairfield University men's soccer team. Under Rees' leadership, the Fairfield Stags program has achieved a number of milestones. He was the first to coach a Fairfield University team to a top 25 national ranking while earning himself MAAC and NSCAA New England Coach of the Year awards in 1998. He coached the Stags to its first MAAC tournament title and the program's first NCAA tournament play-in berth in 1999. He also coached the Stags to its first win in an NCAA tournament game, defeating the University of Connecticut on the road to advance to the tournament's second round in 2006. And he coached the Stags to its third NCAA tournament game in 2008. Further, he has developed ten NSCAA Regional All-Americans and several players who have gone on to play at the international level for the Canadian men's national soccer team and at the professional level in the Major League Soccer and United Soccer Leagues.

Rees holds the United States Soccer Federation National 'A' License and National Soccer Coaches Association of America Advanced National Diploma. He was a Region I Olympic Development staff coach and a Technical Advisor for the 1994 World Cup held in the United States.

Preceded by Dejan Cokic	Fairfield University Men's Head Soccer Coach; 1996–2023	Succeeded by Krystian Witkowski
