= Gad Tedeschi =

Israeli jurist

- גד טדסקי
- Born: 1907; Rovigo, Italy
- Died: 1992 (aged 84–85)
- Occupation: Jurist
- Awards: Israel Prize (1954)

Gad Tedeschi (Hebrew: גד טדסקי; Italian: Guido Tedeschi) (born 1907; died 1992) was an Israeli jurist.

== Early life ==
Tedeschi was born in the town of Rovigo in north-eastern Italy in 1907. He emigrated to the British Mandate of Palestine in 1939, entering the country initially with a tourist visa.

== Awards ==
- In 1954, Tedeschi was awarded the Israel Prize, for jurisprudence.

== See also ==
- List of Israel Prize recipients
- Tedeschi
