= Integral Molten Salt Reactor =

Nuclear power plant design

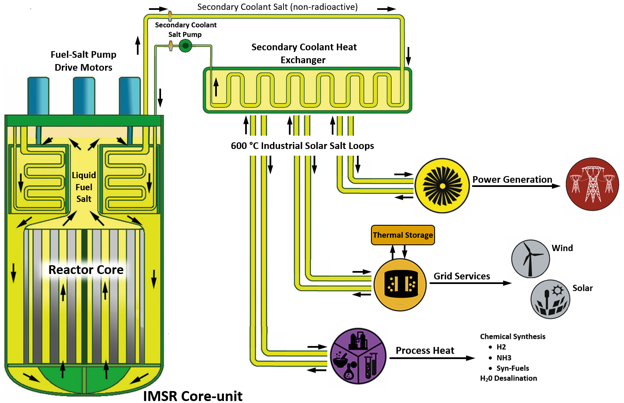
The IMSR design is used for a variety of heat demand applications, ranging from power generation to cogeneration, or process-heat only.

The integral molten salt reactor (IMSR) is a design by the U.S. company Terrestrial Energy for a molten salt reactor in a small modular reactor format.

It is based closely on the denatured molten salt reactor (DMSR), a reactor design from Oak Ridge National Laboratory. In addition, it incorporates some elements found in the small modular advanced high temperature reactor (SmAHTR), a later design from the same laboratory. The IMSR belongs to the DMSR class of molten salt reactors (MSR) and hence is a "burner" reactor that employs a liquid fuel rather than a conventional solid fuel. This liquid contains the nuclear fuel as well as serving as the primary coolant.

Terrestrial Energy and The Texas A&M University System announced plans in February 2025 to site an IMSR plant at the Texas A&M-RELLIS campus about 9 miles west of Texas A&M University in College Station. The company claims it will have its first commercial IMSRs licensed and operating in the early 2030s.

== Design ==
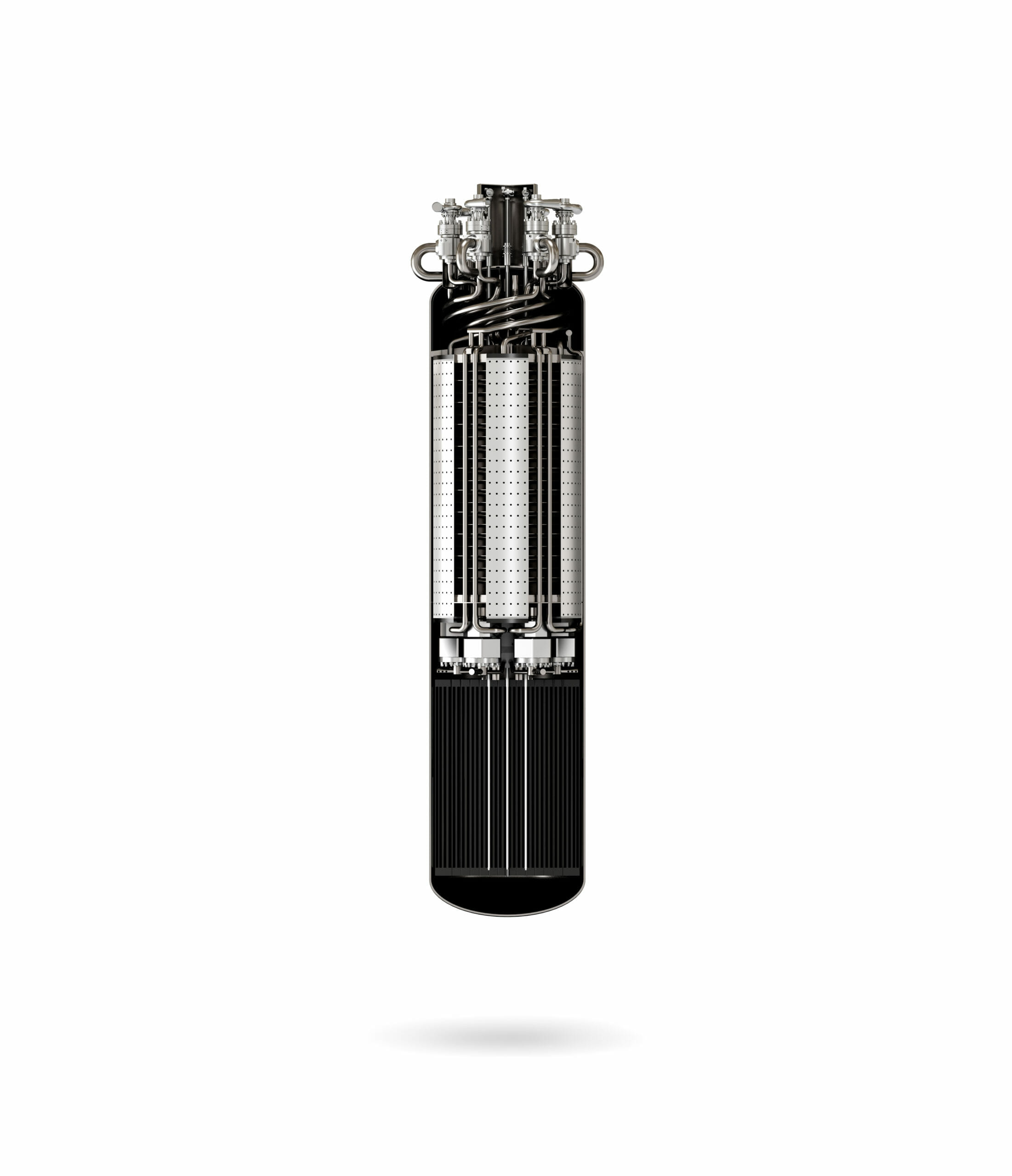
This cut-away view shows the internals of the IMSR Core-unit, which has a diameter of 4.1 meters and height of 18 meters.

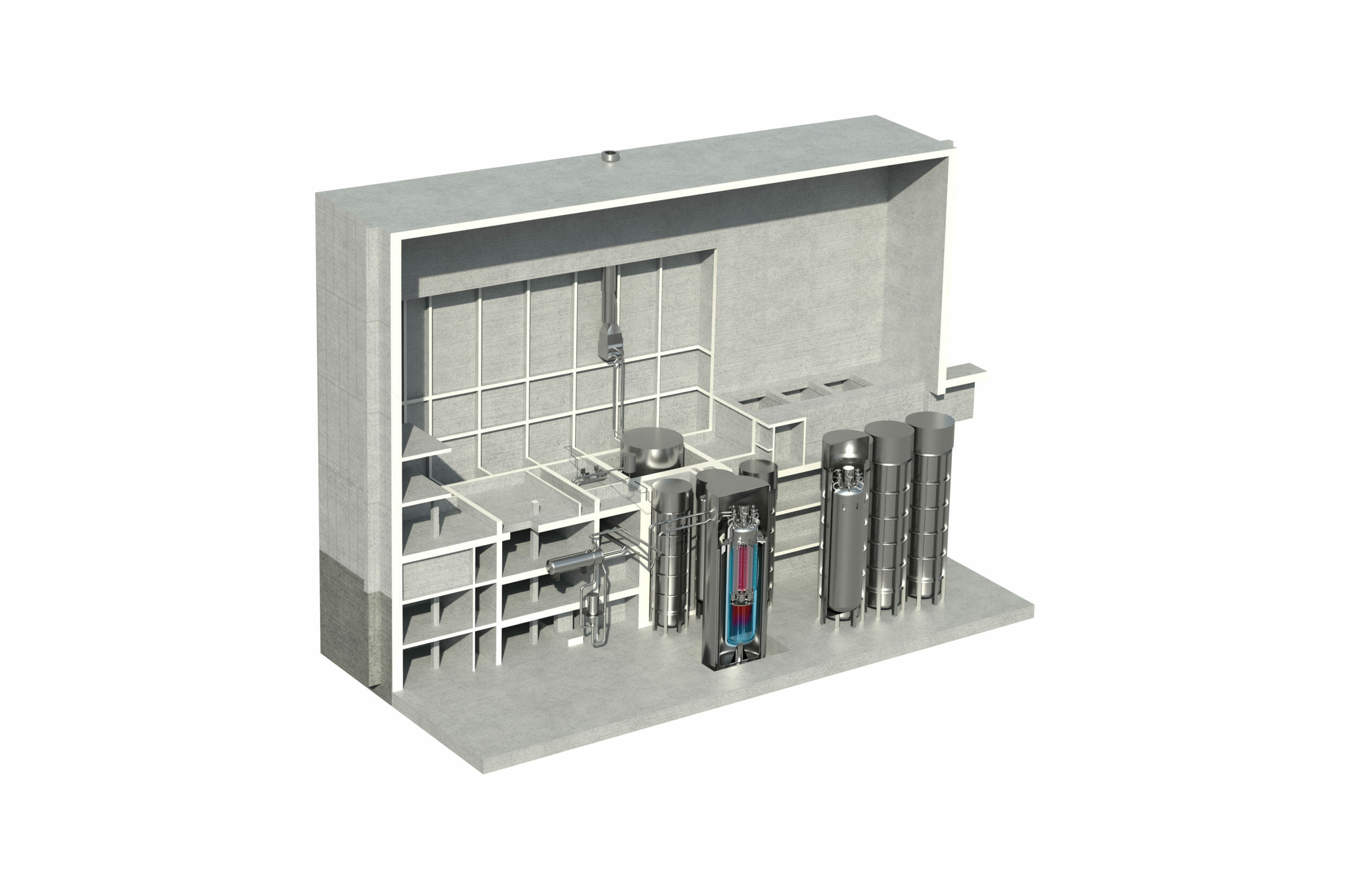
The IMSR facility in cutaway view. The Core-unit is shown at the center of the facility.

The integral molten salt reactor (IMSR) integrates into a compact, sealed and replaceable nuclear reactor unit, called the IMSR Core-unit. The Core-unit comes in a single size designed to deliver 442 megawatts of thermal heat. If used to generate electricity then the notional capacity is 195 megawatts electrical. The unit includes all the primary components of the nuclear reactor that operate on the liquid molten fluoride salt fuel: moderator, primary heat exchangers, pumps and shutdown rods. The Core-unit forms the heart of the IMSR system. In the Core-unit, the fuel salt is circulated between the graphite core and heat exchangers. The Core-unit itself is placed inside a surrounding vessel called the guard vessel. The entire Core-unit module can be lifted out for replacement. The guard vessel that surrounds the Core-unit acts as a containment vessel. In turn, a shielded silo surrounds the guard vessel.

The IMSR belongs to the denatured molten salt reactor (DMSR) class of molten salt reactors (MSR). It is designed to have all the safety features associated with the Molten Salt class of reactors including low pressure operation (the reactor and primary coolant is operated near normal atmospheric pressure), the inability to lose primary coolant (the fuel is the coolant), the inability to suffer a meltdown accident (the fuel operates in an already molten state) and the robust chemical binding of the fission products within the primary coolant salt (reduced pathway for accidental release of fission products).

The design uses standard assay low-enriched uranium fuel, with less than 5% U^{235} with a simple converter (also known as a "burner") fuel cycle objective (as do most operating power reactors today). The proposed fuel is in the form of uranium tetrafluoride (UF_{4}) blended with carrier salts. The IMSR purposely avoids the use of either enriched lithium or beryllium as both are costly, of limited commercial supply, and lead to high levels of radioactive tritium production.

These carrier salts increase the heat capacity of the fuel and lower the fuel's melting point. The fuel salt blend also acts as the primary coolant for the reactor.

The IMSR is a thermal-neutron reactor moderated by vertical graphite elements. The molten salt fuel-coolant mixture flows upward through these graphite elements where it goes critical. After heating up in this moderated core the liquid fuel flows upward through a central common chimney and is then pulled downward by pumps through heat exchanges positioned inside the reactor vessel. The liquid fuel then flow down the outer edge of the reactor core to repeat the cycle. All the primary components, heat exchangers, pumps etc. are positioned inside the reactor vessel. The reactor’s integrated architecture avoids the use of external piping for the fuel that could leak or break.

The piping external to the reactor vessel contain two additional salt loops in series: a secondary, nonradioactive coolant salt, followed by another (third) coolant salt. These salt loops act as additional barriers to any radionuclides, as well as improving the system's heat capacity. It also allows easier integration with the heat sink end of the plant; either process heat or power applications using standard industrial grade steam turbine plants are envisioned by Terrestrial Energy.

The IMSR Core-unit is designed to be completely replaced after a 7-year period of operation. During operation, small fresh fuel/salt batches are periodically added to the reactor system. This online refueling process does not require the mechanical refueling machinery required for solid fuel reactor systems.

=== Replaceable core-unit ===
The design uses a replaceable Core-unit. When the graphite moderator's lifetime exposure to neutron flux causes it to start distorting beyond acceptable limits, rather than remove and replace the graphite moderator, the entire IMSR Core-unit is replaced as a unit. This includes the pumps, pump motors, shutdown rods, heat exchangers and graphite moderator, all of which are either inside the vessel or directly attached to it. To facilitate a replacement, the design employs two reactor silos in the reactor building, one operating and one idle or with a previous, empty, spent Core-unit in cool-down. After seven years of operation, the Core-unit is shut down and cools in place to allow short-lived radionuclides to decay. After that cool-down period, the spent Core-unit is lifted out and eventually replaced.

Simultaneously, a new Core-unit is installed and activated in the second silo. This entails connection to the secondary (coolant) salt piping, placement of the containment head and biological shield and loading with fresh fuel salt. The containment head provides double containment (the first being the sealed reactor vessel itself). The new Core-unit can now start its seven years of power operations.

The IMSR vendor accumulates sealed, spent IMSR Core-units and spent fuel salt tanks in onsite, below grade silos. This operational mode reduces uncertainties with respect to long service life of materials and equipment, replacing them by design rather than allowing age-related issues such as creep or corrosion to accumulate.

=== Online refueling ===
The IMSR employs online fueling. While operating, small fresh fuel salt batches are periodically added to the reactor system. As the reactor uses circulating liquid fuel this process does not require complex mechanical refueling machinery. The reactor vessel is never opened, thereby ensuring a clean operating environment. During the seven years, no fuel is removed from the reactor; this differs from solid fuel reactors which must remove fuel to make room for any new fuel assemblies, limiting fuel utilization.

=== Efficiency ===
IMSR provides final heat at temperatures of around 550–600 °C, which results in an efficiency in the 44–45% range.

== Licensing ==
Terrestrial Energy is working to license (in both Canada and the USA) an IMSR design with a thermal power capacity of 442 MW (equivalent to 195 MW electrical). As standard industrial grade steam turbines are proposed, cogeneration, or combined heat and power, is also possible.

In 2016, Terrestrial Energy engaged in a pre-licensing design review for the IMSR with the Canadian Nuclear Safety Commission (CNSC). It successfully completed the first stage of this process in late 2017, and entered the second phase of the design review in October 2018. Terrestrial Energy claims it will have its first commercial IMSRs licensed and operating in the 2020s.

On August 15, 2019, CNSC and the United States Nuclear Regulatory Commission signed a joint memorandum of cooperation (MOC) aimed at enhancing technical reviews of advanced reactor and small modular reactor technologies. As part of the MOC, the agencies undertook in May 2022 a joint review of Terrestrial Energy’s Postulated Initiating Events (PIE) analysis and methodology for the IMSR® This work is foundational for further regulatory safety reviews and the regulatory program to prepare license applications required to operate IMSR® plants in Canada and the United States.

In 2023 the CNSC completed phase 2 of a Vendor Design Review and declared that there were no fundamental barriers to licensing the IMSR design. However this decision is non-binding and Terrestrial Energy still need a site and construction license to proceed. In the U.S., the company is conducting pre-licensing engagements regarding the IMSR with the NRC.

== See also ==
Media related to Integral Molten Salt Reactor at Wikimedia Commons
