= Paul Fargis =

Paul McKenna Fargis (born 1939) is an American publisher, editor and author. In 1978, he founded The Stonesong Press, Inc., a company that developed book projects from the initial concept through final manuscript, printer-ready materials or printed and bound books delivered to a participating publisher. Stonesong was the first company to cooperatively develop major popular reference books with well-known institutions and brand names, including Harvard University Medical School, The Library of Congress, The American Pharmaceutical Association, Lands End, ESPN, The American Film Institute, National Geographic and others. Several of the Stonesong reference titles won Notable Book Awards and Best Reference recognition from the American Library Association and others. Mr. Fargis edited and produced more than a dozen reference works with The New York Public Library, the best known being four editions of The New York Public Library Desk Reference.

In addition, Fargis formed Round Stone Press in 1990 with two partners, Susan Meyer and Marsha Melnick. This imprint specialized in the development and production of illustrated reference works. The company was later renamed Grand Central Press, absorbed by The Stonesong Press and is no longer active. That company produced works with Reader's Digest, Woman's Day, The National Wildlife Federation, National Geographic, and National Public Radio.

Fargis has worked in every area of trade book publishing including editorial, sales, publicity, royalty systems, contracts, and subsidiary rights. Prior to founding Stonesong, he was the Publisher and Editor in Chief of Thomas Y. Crowell Co. and Funk and Wagnalls, companies that became divisions of Harper and Row (now HarperCollins) where he then acted as Managing Director of the three imprints.

Paul Fargis is a founding member and past President of The American Book Producers Association and The Charitable Book Program. He has acted as an expert witness in cases involving publishing disputes and has been a consultant to a number of firms and authors. He was a member of the American Book Council and has been an appraiser for the Internal Revenue Service concerning the fair market value of literary properties.

Mr. Fargis is a graduate of Fairfield University (1961) and holds a Master of Arts degree in Education from the New York University Graduate Institute of Book Publishing. He is the author or editor of several books and articles. His bylined books include:

- The Consumers Handbook (1966, 1974)
- The New York Public Library Desk Reference (1989 et al.)
- Perks and Parachutes
- The Big Book of Life’s Instructions
- Company’s Coming (1968)
- I’m Writing My Own Cookbook (1978)
- Life’s Little Destruction Book

Shortly after receiving his master's degree he joined Hawthorn Books as an editor and a year later became the American Editor of the 150-volume international Twentieth Century Encyclopedia of Catholicism. During that tenure he also acted as Managing Editor of Twentieth Century Catholicism, a short-lived periodical.

Mr. Fargis sold Stonesong to his daughter Alison Fargis and Ellen Scordato who continue running the company today. Mr. Fargis now acts as a publishing consultant specializing in negotiating and interpreting publishing contracts and evaluating book proposals.

After retirement, Mr Fargis became a licensed Home Improvement contractor in Westchester County, NY allowing him to pursue a lifelong love of carpentry and building. He holds a patent for an expandable folding device for printed material. And he has served on the Board of Directors of his church, the Unitarian Fellowship of Northern Westchester. Earlier he served as the Executive Director of the Harrison Town Recreation Commission, member of the Harrison Town Forum, on the Board of Directors of the United States Catholic Historical Society, on the Advisory Board of the Graduate School of Corporate and Political Communication at Fairfield University (1969 to 1981) He served as a crew member of the Katonah Bedford Hills Volunteer Ambulance Corps. He enjoys stonework and sculpture and is an avid hiker. Currently he lives in New Paltz New York

Paul Fargis is married to the Reverend Dawn Sangrey, a Unitarian Universalist minister and author, and they have a son Christopher. He is also the father of Alison Fargis and John Fargis from an earlier marriage. He has five grandchildren.
