= John Archbold =

John Archbold may refer to:

- John Dustin Archbold (1848–1916), American capitalist and oil refiner
- John Frederick Archbold (1785–1870), British legal writer
