= Michael O'Keeffe (footballer) =

New Zealand footballer (born 1990)

Personal information
- Full name: Michael Peter O'Keeffe
- Date of birth: 9 August 1990 (age 36)
- Place of birth: Auckland, New Zealand
- Height: 1.83 m (6 ft 0 in)
- Position: Goalkeeper

Team information
- Current team: Team Wellington
- Number: 1

Youth career
- Avon United
- 2009–2012: Fairfield Stags

Senior career*
Years	Team	Apps	(Gls)
2007–2009	Canterbury United	14	(0)
2013	Ocean City Nor'easters	5	(0)
2014–2015	Team Wellington		

International career^{‡}
2007	New Zealand U17	1	(0)
2008–2012	New Zealand U23	6	(0)
- * Club domestic league appearances and goals as of 23:01, 2 June 2013 (UTC) ‡ National team caps and goals as of 22:01, 30 July 2012 (UTC)

Michael Peter O'Keeffe (born 9 August 1990) is a New Zealand former footballer who plays as a goalkeeper. Since 2017 until its closure in July 2024, O’Keeffe has been a TV reporter and presenter for Newshub. He is the younger brother of rugby union referee, Ben O'Keeffe.

== Career ==
O'Keeffe grew up in Blenheim, New Zealand and was schooled at Marlborough Boys' College and Christchurch Boys' High School. He then moved to Fairfield, Connecticut where he began his university studies whilst also on a full soccer scholarship. O'Keeffe graduated from Fairfield University with a Bachelor of Arts (B.A), Television New Media.

Michael moved to Wellington, New Zealand, where he honed his goal keeping skills as a member of Blenheim All Stars indoor handball team.

In June 2012 O'Keeffe received a late call-up to the All Whites as an injury replacement for Mark Paston in the 2012 OFC Nations Cup.

O'Keeffe was selected for the New Zealand U23 national team, participating in the 2012 Summer Olympics.

In 2013 O'Keeffe joined USL Premier Development League team Ocean City Nor'easters.

In 2014, he returned to New Zealand to play for Team Wellington in the 2014–15 ASB Premiership.

Since 2017, he has been a TV reporter and presenter for Newshub.
