= Eileen Rominger =

American businessman

Director of Investment Management, U.S. Securities & Exchange Commission
- Incumbent
- Assumed office February 7, 2011
- President: Barack Obama

Personal details
- Born: Eileen Clarkin
- Education: Fairfield University (B.A.); Wharton School of Business (M.B.A.)
- Profession: Portfolio manager

Eileen Rominger is a partner at CamberView Partners. Previously, Rominger was the director of investment management at the United States Securities and Exchange Commission ("SEC") and the global chief investment officer of Goldman Sachs Asset Management.

SmartMoney magazine named Rominger to the 2011 Power 30 list of the World's Most Influential Players in business and finance. And Investment Advisor magazine named Rominger one of the 2011 IA 25 Most Influential People in the Advisor Community.

== Career ==
Before to joining the SEC, Rominger worked 11 years at Goldman Sachs Asset Management, informally known as "GSAM", where she served as its global chief investment officer overseeing the investment operations of GSAM's fundamental equity, quantitative investment strategies and fixed-income businesses. Rominger also served as Chief Investment Officer of the GSAM's U.S. Value business where she led a team of portfolio managers and analysts in the investment of clients' assets in Large, Mid, and Small Cap Value portfolios. She earned more than $57 Million at Goldman Sachs, causing some to perceive a conflict of interest when she joined the SEC. On June 15, 2012, she announced her retirement from the SEC after serving 16 months at the regulator.

Prior to joining Goldman Sachs in 1999, Rominger worked 18 years at Oppenheimer Capital, where she was a value portfolio manager, a managing director, and a member of the executive committee.

Rominger was a 2005 S&P/Business Week Excellence in Fund Management Award Winner and was profiled by Barron's Magazine in 2006. She routinely appeared on Wall Street Week with Louis Rukeyser and has appeared on Bloomberg News and CNBC.

In 2000, Fairfield University recognized Rominger's professional accomplishments by awarding her an Alumni Professional Achievement Award.

== Education ==
Rominger received a B.A. in English from Fairfield University and an M.B.A. in finance from the Wharton School of Business.
