= Mark Longwell =

American retired soccer defender (born 1960)

Personal information
- Place of birth: Stamford, Connecticut, United States
- Height: 6 ft 0 in (1.83 m)
- Position: Defender

Youth career
- 1975–1977: Trumbull High School

College career
Years	Team	Apps	(Gls)
1978–1981	Fairfield Stags		

Senior career*
Years	Team	Apps	(Gls)
1978	Slough Town	10	(1)
1983	Tampa Bay Rowdies	5	(0)
1983–1984	Tampa Bay Rowdies (indoor)	4	(0)
1984	Fort Lauderdale Sun	20	(?)

International career
1983	USA B Team	2	(0)
- * Club domestic league appearances and goals

Mark Longwell (born 1960 in Stamford, Connecticut) is an American retired soccer defender who played professionally in the North American Soccer League and United Soccer League.

== Career ==
=== Youth and college ===
Longwell played high school soccer at Trumbull High School in Trumbull, Connecticut where he a two-time All-State selection. He then played college soccer for Fairfield University where he was named All New England and the Tri-State Conference MVP in his junior and senior years. Longwell played with Slough Town FC in Slough, England in 1978, trained with Liverpool F.C. in the summer of 1980, and trained with Chelsea FC in the summer of 1982.

=== Professional ===
Longwell played for Slough Town F.C. in 1978 in the English Isthmian League. After Fairfield, Longwell had multiple tryouts at the professional level. He then signed with the Tampa Bay Rowdiesof the North American Soccer League. He made his professional debut on August 5, 1983, against the Chicago Sting, in a 4–3 win. He also played for the 1983–84 Tampa Bay Rowdies Indoor team. On April 3, 1984, Longwell signed with the Fort Lauderdale Sun of the newly established United Soccer League. The Sun went on to win the 1984 USL championship with Longwell as captain.

=== International ===
Longwell was a member of the United States men's national soccer team B Team which toured Malaysia and Singapore in 1983.
