= Ralph Archbold =

American actor and speaker (1942–2017)

- Born: January 17, 1942; Dearborn, Michigan, United States
- Died: March 25, 2017 (aged 75); Philadelphia, Pennsylvania, United States
- Occupations: Actor, impersonator
- Years active: 1973–2017
- Known for: Impersonation of United States Founding Father Benjamin Franklin
- Spouse: Linda Wilde (m. 2008)

Ralph Archbold (January 17, 1942 – March 25, 2017) was a Philadelphia-area actor and speaker best known for his long-time impersonation of United States Founding Father Benjamin Franklin.

== Franklin impersonation ==
Archbold began impersonating Franklin in 1973 for a local summer production in Dearborn, Michigan. He enjoyed the role so much he read over 200 of Franklin's books, and realized that he was born on Franklin's birthday, January 17. He began performing at schools full-time, and in 1981 moved to Philadelphia to continue his impersonation in Franklin's home city where demand was higher. He gave frequent speeches for company meetings, and was regularly seen sitting on a park bench in Franklin Court.

He was declared the official Benjamin Franklin for the city of Philadelphia, and was awarded Philadelphia magazine's Best of Philly Award. Archbold's photo appeared frequently in tourist literature and brochures, and in advertisements for Franklin Computer Corporation. He also appeared on television, including Today, The History Channel, and The Colbert Report. Archbold was also featured at the Philadelphia celebration "200 Years of Benjamin Franklin's Genius" and in "The Franklin Pleaser", a video produced by Philadelphia sketch group Secret Pants for the Philadelphia Film Festival; appeared for every President of the United States since Gerald Ford; and was appointed by George W. Bush to a 15-member commission to oversee the celebration of Franklin's 300th birthday.

Archbold, like Franklin, was balding and required the use of bifocals and cane. He wore period clothing, including a frilly shirt, a vest, and shoes with buckles, making his appearance historically accurate.

== Personal life ==
On July 3, 2008, Archbold married Linda Wilde, a historical impersonator known for playing Betsy Ross. The wedding was held in front of Independence Hall, entirely in costume, with Philadelphia Mayor Michael Nutter officiating, followed by a complimentary reception at the City Tavern. At one point he suffered a stroke, but expressed his hope to resume his Franklin impersonation by July 2010. In 2013, he was present, in character, for the reopening of the Franklin Museum in Philadelphia.

Archbold died of complications congestive heart failure in Philadelphia on March 25, 2017, at the age of 75.
