= Rick Pych =

American professional sports executive

Rich Pych
- Education: Fairfield University (BS)
- Years active: 2019–present
- Employer: Spurs Sports & Entertainment
- Title: Strategic Advisor

Rick Pych (/pɪtʃ/ PITCH; born in Hartford, Connecticut) is an American professional sports executive. He is the strategic advisor and past president and CEO of Spurs Sports & Entertainment, which runs the NBA San Antonio Spurs and Frost Bank Center

Spurs owner Peter Holt promoted Pych to his current position on July 15, 2008, where Pych oversees the marketing, sales, finance, communications and corporate development for the Spurs organization's business initiatives. He is also chief development officer of the Frost Bank Center and led the franchise through its development, construction and opening in 2002.

Pych first joined the Spurs organization in 1993 previously serving as chief financial officer of Spurs Sports & Entertainment from 1993 to 2000 and executive vice president of finance and corporate development from 2000 to 2008. "In 2008, he was named president of business operations and took over as president and CEO in 2016."

Pych received his bachelor's degree in accounting from the Fairfield University Dolan School of Business in 1975.
