= Ronald A. Bosco =

American academic (born 1945)

Ronald A. Bosco (born in Farmingdale, New York) is the Distinguished Professor of English and American Literature at the University at Albany, State University of New York, is currently President of the Association for Documentary Editing and General Editor of The Collected Works of Ralph Waldo Emerson published by Harvard University Press. Bosco is one of the country's leading experts on the works of Ralph Waldo Emerson and on American Puritan homiletics and poetics.

== Academic career ==
At UAlbany since 1975 and an editor of the Emerson Papers at Harvard's Houghton Library since 1977, Bosco has lectured and published extensively on Puritan homiletics and poetics, nineteenth-century American intellectual and literary history, and the theory and practice of documentary and textual editing.

His recent awards include a Doctorate (Honoris Causa) from Soka University of Japan; the Thoreau Society Medal; the Lyman H. Butterfield Award of the Association for Documentary Editing; and the Ralph Waldo Emerson Society Distinguished Achievement Award.

In 2003, on the occasion of Emerson's 200th birthday, he delivered the commemorative lecture, "What Poems are Many Private Lives," at the Emerson House in Concord, Massachusetts, for the Emerson family and the Town of Concord.

In April 2007, Bosco was invited to participate in the forum "Re-conceiving Self and Society: The American Renaissance in Retrospect" at Soka University of America. Other participants included Sarah Wider (Colgate University), Kenneth M. Price (University of Nebraska, Lincoln), and Jim Merod (Soka University of America).

== Selected works ==
- The Journals and Miscellaneous Notebooks of Ralph Waldo Emerson, edited with Glen M. Johnson, 1982, Harvard University Press
- Ralph Waldo Emerson: A Bicentennial Exhibition at Houghton Library of the Harvard College Library, with Joel Myerson, 2005, Harvard University Press
- The Collected Works of Ralph Waldo Emerson, 2008, Harvard University Press

== Education ==
Bosco graduated with an A.B. in Philosophy from Fairfield University in 1967; M.A. in Philosophy: Value Theory from Purdue University in 1970; and Ph.D. in English and American Literature from the University of Maryland in 1975.
