= Richard Morgan Downey =

American obesity advocate

- Education: Fairfield University; Georgetown University (JD)
- Occupation: Advocate
- Spouse: Dotty Lynch

Richard Morgan Downey is an American obesity advocate, consultant, and editor of the Downey Obesity Report. Downey is a former executive director of the American Obesity Association and has been involved in obesity advocacy since 1998.

== Activism ==
Downey organized the first conference on obesity as a public policy issue in 1999 and has testified before congressional committees. He has been featured in publications including The New York Times, The Washington Post, and The Wall Street Journal.

From 2006 to 2008, he was the executive vice president of the Obesity Society. In 2008, Downey conducted forums at both the Democratic and Republican National Party Conventions. Obesity was mentioned in the Democratic and Republican party platforms in 2008, following discussions at the national conventions.

Downey has consulted with several organizations on obesity issues and serves as the Policy Director of the STOP Obesity Alliance (part of George Washington University's School of Public Health and Health Services), and is a member of the steering committee of the Coalition to Prevent DVT.

== Personal life ==
Downey grew up in Brooklyn, New York, and attended Xavier High School. He received his bachelor's degree in history from Fairfield University in 1968 and Juris Doctor from the Georgetown University Law Center in 1971. Downey married journalist Dotty Lynch in 2003.
