= Tedesco (surname) =

Tedesco (or Todesco, or Todisco; plural "Tedeschi") is an Italian word for "German". Etymologically, it derives from Theodiscus, sharing the same root of German "Deutsch". Both Tedesco and Tedeschi are common surnames among Italians, both in Italy and in the diaspora. The surname and its variants means someone from Germany. The surname is also listed as a common Jewish surname in Italy (like "Deutsch" in Germany). Paul Johnson notes that the 'Natione Tedesca' described Jews of German origin, being among the three Jewish ethnic divisions resident in mid-16th-century Venice.

== People ==
People with the surname Tedesco

- Domenico Tedesco (born 1985), German-Italian football manager
- Edward Francis Tedesco, American planetary scientist at JPL
- Elena Tedesco (born 1991), Nuestra Belleza El Salvador 2009
- Francis J. Tedesco (born c. 1943), American medical professor
- Giovanni Tedesco (born 1972), Italian footballer, brother of Giacomo
- Giacomo Tedesco (born 1976), Italian footballer, brother of Giovanni
- James Tedesco (born 1993), Australian-Italian Rugby League player
- Jane Tedesco (1906–1997), American politician
- Johann Paul Schor (1616–1674), Austrian artist, also known as Giovanni Paolo Tedesco
- Juan Carlos Tedesco (1944–2017), Argentine Minister of Education
- Margaret Tedesco (c. 1965–2025) American curator, dancer and visual artist
- Mario Castelnuovo-Tedesco (1895–1968), Italian composer
- Manoah Leide-Tedesco (1895–1982), Italian composer / conductor
- Paola Tedesco (born 1952), Italian actress, daughter of Sergio
- Sergio Tedesco (1928–2012), Italian actor / voice actor / tenor, father of Paola
- Tommy Tedesco (1930–1997), American musician

People with the surname Tedisco

- Jim Tedisco (born 1950), American politician

People with the surname Todisco

- Salvatore Todisco (1961–1990), Italian boxer
- Settimio Todisco (1924–2025), Italian Roman Catholic archbishop
