= Bernard McGrane =

American sociologist and author

Bernard McGrane (born c. 1947) is an American sociologist, author, and associate professor of sociology at Chapman University's Wilkinson College of Humanities & Social Sciences in Orange, California. He received a BA in 1969 from Fairfield University, and a Ph.D. in 1976 from New York University. for a thesis . "Beyond Europe : an archaeology of anthropology from the sixteenth to the early twentieth century"

== Career ==
McGrane has authored numerous books, including The Un-TV and the 10 MPH Car, This Book is Not Required: An Emotional Survival Manual for Students, and Beyond Anthropology, Society and the Other.

He also wrote and was featured in a DVD on the hidden messages of advertisements in The Ad and the ID: Sex, Death, and Subliminal Advertising

== Beginner's Mind ==
Bernard McGrane has championed the idea in Sociology of exercising the beginner's mind. This idea was adopted from the Zen Buddhist custom of Shoshin. The concept of "beginner's mind" suggests that sociology should view the world without presuppositions, thus bringing new insight into the field. Those preconceptions are the impediments that prevents us to take part in the world as a whole.

== Publications ==
- McGrane, Bernard, and John Gunderson. Watching TV Is Not Required: Thinking About Media and Thinking About Thinking. New York: Routledge, 2010. ISBN 978-0-415-99486-6
- Bell, Inge, and Bernard McGrane. This Book Is Not Required: An Emotional Survival Manual for Students. Thousand Oaks, Calif: Pine Forge Press, 1999.ISBN 9780761985723
  - Review by Frank B Varney; Inge Bell; Teaching Sociology, Jan., 2000, vol. 28, no. 1, p. 90-92
- McGrane, Bernard. The Un-TV and the 10 Mph Car: Experiments in Personal Freedom and Everyday Life. Fort Bragg, Calif: The Small Press, 1994. ISBN 978-1-878020-05-5
  - Review, by Raymond Rymph; Teaching Sociology, Apr., 1995, vol. 23, no. 2, p. 183-184
- McGrane, Bernard. Beyond Anthropology: Society and the Other. New York: Columbia University Press, 1989. ISBN 9780231066846 In 480 American libraries according to
  - Review, by Jiri Kolaja The Annals of the American Academy of Political and Social Science, Jan., 1991, vol. 513, p. 195
  - Review, by Peter H HareThe Journal of American History, Sep., 1990, vol. 77, no. 2, p. 635-636
  - Review, by Elvi Whittake Anthropologica, 1990, vol. 32, no. 1, p. 128-129
  - Review, by Robert Deliège Man, Jun., 1994, vol. 29, no. 2, p. 490-491
  - Review by Sydney R Story American Anthropologist, Sep., 1990, vol. 92, no. 3, p. 813-814
  - Review by Elizabeth A Williams The American Historical Review, Oct., 1991, vol. 96, no. 4, p. 1156–1157

== See also ==
- Shoshin
