= Peter Michael Gish =

American combat artist and painter (1926–2024)

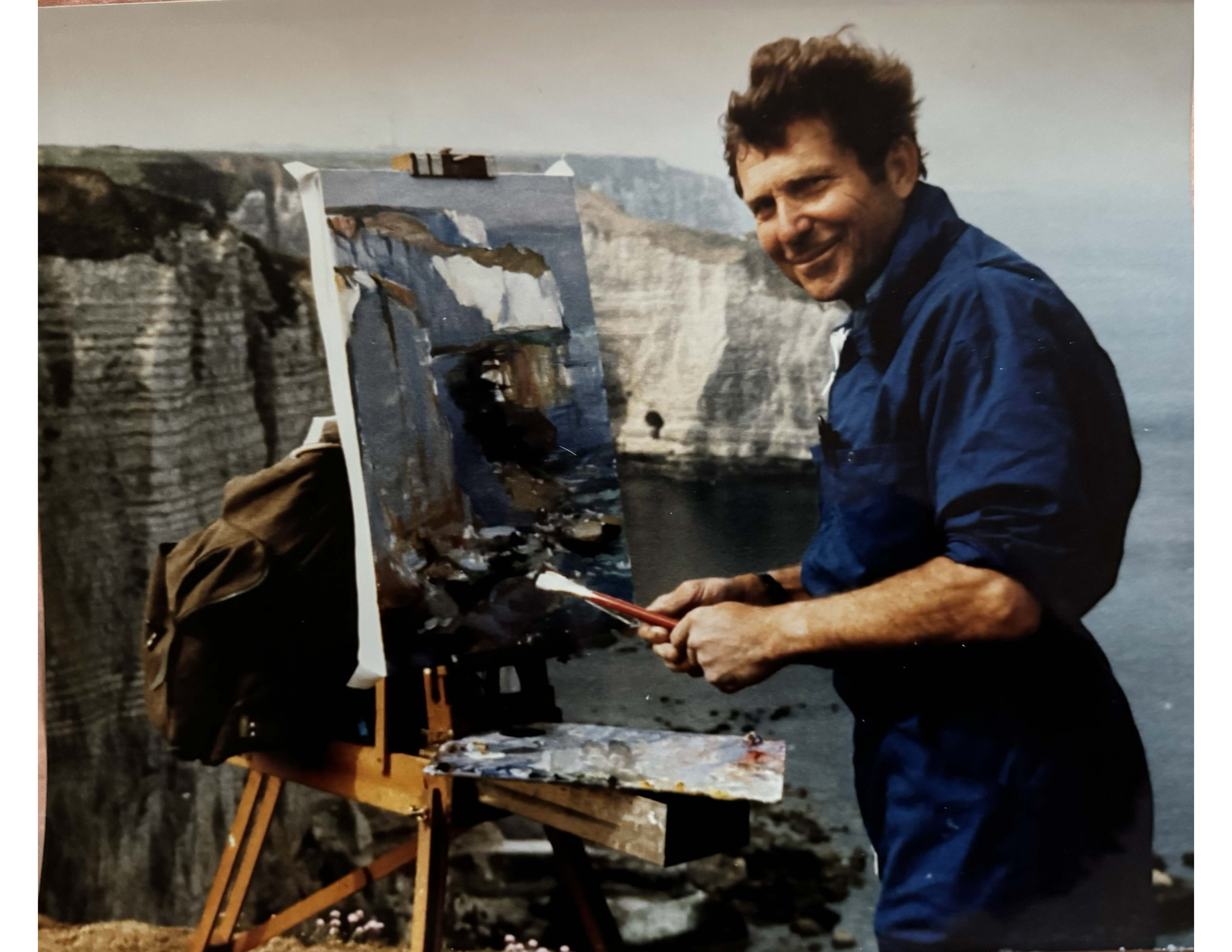
Peter Michael Gish painting at Etretat (1985)

Peter Michael Gish (1926–2024) was an American combat artist, painter, aviator, and academic. He served as a United States Marine Corps officer and was noted for his contributions to military art, painting and art education. Over his career, Gish participated in World War II, the Korean War, the Vietnam War, and post-retirement humanitarian missions in Iraq and Somalia. He was a tenured professor of fine arts at Fairfield University and an alumnus of Dartmouth College and Yale University.

== Early life and education ==
Gish was born in New York City in 1926 and raised in Westport, Connecticut. His father, a 1915 graduate of Dartmouth College, worked for Standard Oil in China, and his mother was a member of the Baldwin family of Derby, Connecticut.

In 1943, Gish enrolled at Dartmouth College as part of the U.S. Navy V-5 Aviation Training Program. After the death of his older brother, Carl K. Gish II, in the Battle of Saipan, he accelerated his training and joined the United States Marine Corps as an aviator.

Following World War II, Gish returned to Dartmouth and completed a Bachelor of Arts in Fine Arts. He was chosen to design the Dartmouth Winter Carnival Poster of 1948. After graduating from Dartmouth, Gish apprenticed with the New England painter Paul Sample.

He subsequently studied at the École Nationale Supérieure Des Beaux-Arts in Paris. During the period 1957 to 1958, Gish studied under the Austrian expressionist painter Oskar Kokoschka in Salzburg. His artistic education later took him to Spain, where he refined his plein air technique and expressionist style. Gish earned a Master of Fine Arts from Yale University in 1964.

== Military service and combat art ==
Gish was recalled to active duty, serving as a helicopter pilot. He eventually retired from the USMC with the rank of colonel.

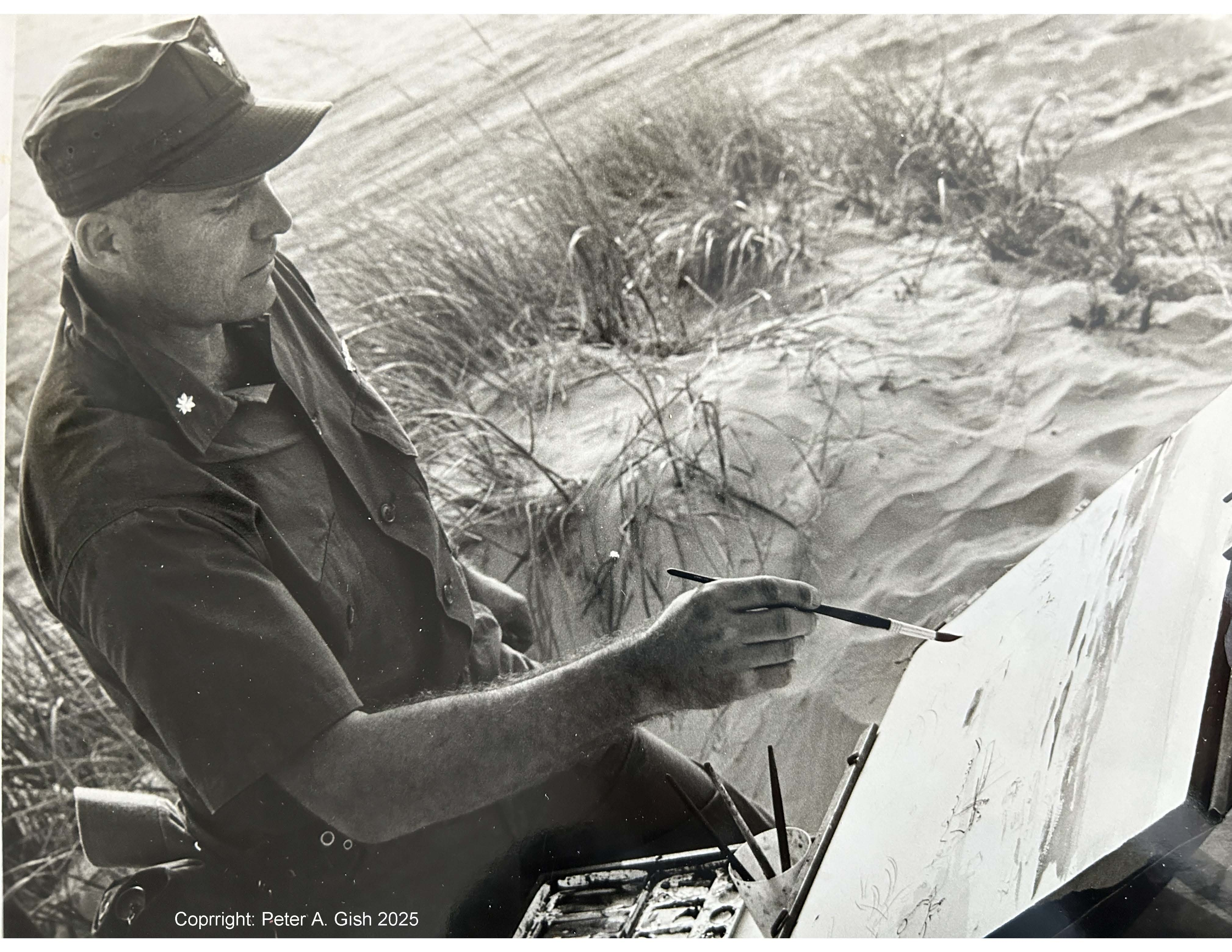
Peter Michael Gish in Vietnam (1967)

In 1967, during the Vietnam War, he volunteered as a combat artist, flying 24 combat missions and receiving the Air Medal for his service. Through his artwork, Gish portrayed a range of aspects of the Vietnam War, with a special emphasis on medical evacuations and troop extractions. Many of his paintings have been displayed at the National Museum of the Marine Corps.

In the early 1990s, Gish returned to service during Operation Provide Comfort in northern Iraq to document U.S. and allied support for Kurdish refugees. In 1992, he was deployed to Somalia during Operation Restore Hope, where he depicted famine relief operations. He was awarded the Meritorious Service Medal in 1993 for his service in Somalia.

== Academic and artistic career ==
Gish taught fine arts at Fairfield University in Connecticut, starting in 1971. He was promoted to associate professor in 1974 and received tenure in 1980. For his sabbatical year, he spent six months painting the cliffs of Etretat in Normandy, France. He retired from teaching in Fairfield University in 1992. Among Gish's early projects were the Vermont murals painted in 1950 at the Hotel Coolidge in White River Junction, Vermont.

He remained active into his 90s, painting daily, regardless of the weather.

Gish painted the official portraits of two Dartmouth College Presidents, John Sloan Dickey, and James Wright, both of which are part of the permanent collection at Dartmouth College. In recognition of his contributions to his service, country, and college, Gish was posthumously awarded the 2025 James Wright Award for Distinguished Service by the Dartmouth Uniformed Service Alumni.

== Personal life ==
In 1954, Gish married Marguerite Drouin, a French-born United Nations translator. The couple had three children. He maintained strong ties to Dartmouth College and the USMC throughout his life. Gish died in 2024 at the age of 98.
