= Barry Archbold =

Australian rules footballer

Personal information
- Full name: Barry Archbold
- Born: 11 December 1933 (age 92)
- Original team: Traralgon
- Height: 179 cm (5 ft 10 in)
- Weight: 83 kg (183 lb)

Playing career^{1}
Years	Club	Games (Goals)
1955	Carlton	2 (0)
- ^{1} Playing statistics correct to the end of 1955.

Barry Archbold (born 11 December 1933) is a former Australian rules footballer who played for the Carlton Football Club in the Victorian Football League (VFL).

Archbold returned to Traralgon in 1956.
