= Orlando P. Carvalho =

- Citizenship: U. S.
- Education: Fairfield University (SM); University of Maryland (MBA)
- Known for: Executive vice president at Lockheed Martin
- Scientific career
- Fields: Executive vice president of aeronautics at Lockheed Martin
- Workplaces: Lockheed Martin

Orlando P. Carvalho is a former executive vice president of the aeronautics division at Lockheed Martin Corporation.

== Background ==
Carvalho grew up in Vineland, New Jersey, and received a bachelor's degree in mathematics from Fairfield University. He went on to receive his master of business administration degree from the University of Maryland.

== Work ==
He is a former executive vice president of the aeronautics division at Lockheed Martin Corporation. He retired on October 1, 2018, and was replaced by Michele Evans. Before holding this position since 2013, Carvalho was vice president and general manager of the F-35 program. During this same period, Carvalho was interviewed by ABC 4-Corners to respond to the scrutiny that the expensive F-35 program received. Before this, he was vice president and deputy of the F-35 Lightning II Joint Strike Fighter program, and president of Lockheed Martin Mission Systems and Sensors. Carvalho also served on the board of directors for the Smithsonian National Air and Space Museum and on the board of advisors for the University of Maryland Robert H. Smith School of Business. In January 2020, Carvalho was elected as a member of the board of directors for Mercury Systems, Inc.

== Honors and achievements ==
- National Management Association Executive of the Year for 2015
- Secured and managed the Spanish Navy's F-100 Combat System program
