= Jean Malecki =

American public health official

Jean Marie Malecki
- Born: Miami, Florida, U.S.
- Education: Fairfield University, B.A. New York Medical College, M.D. University of Miami, M.P.H.
- Known for: 2001 anthrax attacks
- Medical career
- Profession: Public Health
- Institutions: Palm Beach County Health Department; Nova Southeastern University College of Osteopathic Medicine
- Sub-specialties: Preventive Medicine
- Awards: NLM Local Legend; Face of Public Health; J. Howard Beard Award; Outstanding Woman in Public Health

Jean Marie Malecki is an American public health official who was among the first physicians to deal with a bioterrorism attack in the United States. Dr. Malecki has been the Director of the Palm Beach County Health Department since 1991 and is the Chair of the Department of Preventive Medicine at Nova Southeastern University College of Osteopathic Medicine.

== Early life and education ==
Malecki was born in Miami, Florida. She received her Bachelor of Science degree from Fairfield University in Fairfield, Connecticut, her medical degree from the New York Medical College, and her master's degree in public health at the University of Miami Miller School of Medicine.

== Career ==
During her tenure as the Palm Beach County Health Director, Malecki played a key role in responding to bioterrorism risks during the 2001 anthrax attacks at American Media in Boca Raton, Florida. On October 2, 2001, Robert Stephens, photo editor for the supermarket tabloid publishing company, was admitted to JFK Medical Center, where an initial diagnosis of possible anthrax was made by Dr. Larry Bush, his attending physician. Multiple tests were rapidly conducted by county and state labs, and ultimately by the CDC in Atlanta; meanwhile, Mr. Stevens's condition worsened, and he died October 5.

On October 7, Malecki quarantined the company's building following this suspicious death, citing anthrax as the cause even though some federal and state officials disagreed. Malecki helped start a Healthy Care program, where nurses provide in-home counseling to pregnant women and continued health guidance after the birth. She also helped create a Comprehensive AIDS Program, which provides clinical care, dental care and housing assistance to people with HIV/AIDS.

Malecki has received numerous awards in recognition of her contributions to the fields of public health and preventive medicine. In 2004, Malecki was recognized as Changing the Face of Medicine and honored as a Local Legend by the National Library of Medicine, American Medical Women's Association and United States Representative Robert Wexler (D-FL). The National Library of Medicine added Malecki to its Changing the Face of Medicine: Celebrating America's Women Physicians exhibit at the National Library of Medicine in Bethesda, Maryland.

The American Public Health Association also honored Malecki in 2004 by profiling her in "The Faces of Public Health," a book published by Pfizer celebrating 25 individuals in the public health field from across the United States.

In 2002, the National Association of County and City Health Officials honored Malecki with the J. Howard Beard Award. In 2000, the University of South Florida honored Malecki as an Outstanding Woman in Public Health.
