= Bryan Harkin =

Northern Irish footballer

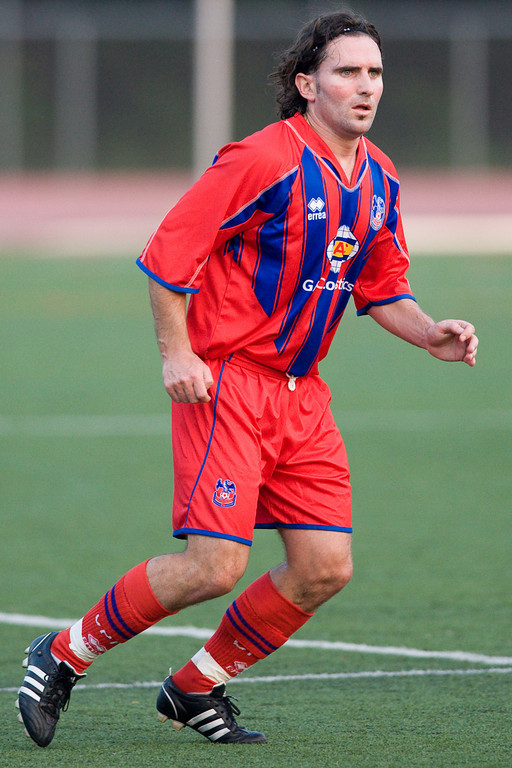

Personal information
- Date of birth: 29 October 1980 (age 46)
- Place of birth: Derry, Northern Ireland
- Height: 5 ft 10 in (1.78 m)
- Position: Midfielder

Team information
- Current team: Crystal Palace Baltimore
- Number: 8

Youth career
- 1999–2002: Fairfield Stags

Senior career*
Years	Team	Apps	(Gls)
2002	Cape Cod Crusaders		
2007–2009	Crystal Palace Baltimore	48	(1)

Managerial career
- 2003–2005: Mount St. Mary's University
- 2009: Loyola University Maryland
- 2017–2020: Emerson College
- 2021-: Harvard Crimson
- * Club domestic league appearances and goals as of 11 October 2009

Bryan Harkin (born October 29, 1980, in Derry) is a Northern Irish soccer player who played for Crystal Palace Baltimore in the USSF Second Division.

== Career ==
=== College and amateur ===
Harkin played college soccer at Fairfield University in Fairfield, Connecticut from 1999 to 2002. In 2000, he set the Stags' single season assist record with 9 while helping lead the team to a No. 15 national ranking, and in 2002 he was selected as a Regional All-American by the NSCAA.

During his college years Harkin also played for the Cape Cod Crusaders in the USL Premier Development League, helping the team win the PDL National Championship in 2002.

=== Professional ===
Harkin signed for Crystal Palace Baltimore prior to the team's inaugural season in 2007, and has been ever-present since then, making 50 appearances for the club in USL Second Division and U.S. Open Cup play, and helping the team to the post-season playoffs in 2008.

Harkin was no longer with the team by the time it folded after the club had separated ties with its parent organization, Crystal Palace F.C.

=== Coaching ===
Harkin coached the women's varsity team at Mount St. Mary's University for three years while gaining an MBA in business.

On August 24, 2009, Harkin was named a volunteer assistant coach for the men's soccer team at Loyola University Maryland. In Fall of 2014, Harkin joined Tufts Men's Soccer coaching staff as an assistant coach. He helped the Jumbos to their first ever DIII National Championship in 2014, a Sweet Sixteen appearance in 2015 and a second National Championship in 2016. Harkin was also honored as the National Coaching staff of the year in 2014 & 2016 by the NSCAA.

In Fall of 2017, Harkin was named Head Coach for the men's soccer team at Emerson College.

Harkin was named Assistant Coach of the Harvard Crimson men's soccer team ahead of the 2021 season.

== Career statistics ==
(correct as of 4 March 2010)

Club	Season	League			Cup			Play-Offs			Total		
Club	Season	Apps	Goals	Assists	Apps	Goals	Assists	Apps	Goals	Assists	Apps	Goals	Assists
Crystal Palace Baltimore	2007	16	1	1	1	0	0	-	-	-	17	1	1
Crystal Palace Baltimore	2008	18	0	2	4	0	1	2	0	0	24	0	3
Crystal Palace Baltimore	2009	14	0	0	0	0	0	0	0	0	14	0	0
Total	2007–present	48	1	3	5	0	1	2	0	0	55	1	4
