= Marco Tedeschi =

Italian rabbi and poet (1817–1869)

Personal life
- Born: 1817 Piova, Piedmont, Kingdom of Sardinia
- Died: 20 December 1869 (aged 51–52) Triest, Austria-Hungary

Religious life
- Religion: Judaism

Jewish leader
- Position: Chief Rabbi of Triest

Marco Tedeschi (Hebrew: מרדכי בן פינחס אשכנזי, romanized: Mordekhai ben Pinḥas Ashkenazi; 1817 – 20 December 1869) was an Italian rabbi and poet.

== Biography ==
Marco Tedeschi was born in Piova, Piedmont, in 1817. Under the direct guidance of his father Felix (d. 1836), who was also a rabbi, he studied at the Collegio Foa di Vercelli. In 1838 he went to Turin to study under Rabbi Hillel Cantoni, and sometime after 1848 he earned a university degree in the sciences.

He held rabbinical positions first in Nizza Monferrato (near Asti), Saluzzo and Asti. From the latter city, he was called to the Jewish community in Triest, where he remained until the end of his life.

Tedeschi was known for his oratory skills, singing voice, and knowledge of both Talmudic studies and classical literature. He maintained an extensive correspondence with many learned rabbis of the continent. He also contributed significantly to the welfare of the poor in his community by providing direct support and promoting humanistic associations and institutions, among them the Israelite Children's Asylum and the Gentilomo Institute for old and infirm Jews.

His main poems were published by Vittorio Castiglioni in the Yelid kinor (Drohobych, 1886).

== Selected publications ==
- Preghiere d'un cuore israelita : raccolta di Preghiere e di Meditazioni per tutte le circostanze della Vita (in Italian). Arti: Tip. del Fratelli Paglieri. 1852. hdl:2027/hvd.hnfqz2. Translated from the French Les prières d'un cœur Israélite.
- Discorso recitato dall' eccellentissimo signore Marco Tedeschi nel solenne suo ingresso alla cattedra di rabbino maggiore della comunità israelitica di Trieste (in Italian). Tip. Coen. 1858.
- Shir mizmor li-khevod ha-Torah (in Hebrew). Triest. 1859.
- Due discorsi in morte del professore Samuel David Luzzatto (in Italian). Triest: Colombo Coen. 1866. hdl:2027/hvd.hx3anm. Also published in French.
- Discorso funebre detto nelle solenni esequie di S. M. Ferdinando Massimiliano imperatore del Messico (in Italian). Triest: Tip. del Lloyd Austriaco. 1867. hdl:2027/hvd.32044080414352.
