= Archibald House =

Archibald House is the name of several buildings.

It may refer to:

== Canada ==
- Archibald House, Moncton, New Brunswick, Canada; former site of the Moncton Public Library
- Leonard Carey Archibald House, Antigonish County, Nova Scotia, Canada; see List of historic places in Antigonish County, Nova Scotia
- Archibald House, several buildings in Colchester County, Nova Scotia, Canada; see List of historic places in Colchester County, Nova Scotia

== UK ==
- Archibald House, BBC Drama Village, Selly Oaks, University of Birmingham, Birmingham, England, UK
- Archibald House, Elie, Fife, Scotland, UK; see List of listed buildings in Elie and Earlsferry, Fife

== USA ==
- Archibald House, Brown University, Providence, Rhode Island, USA; see List of Brown University buildings
- Edward T. Archibald House, Rice County, Dundas, Minnesota, USA; an NRHP-listed farmhouse
- Archibald-Adams House (originally Archibald House), Cherryfield, Maine, USA; an NRHP-listed house
- Archibald-Vroom House (originally Archibald House), Ridgewood, New Jersey, USA; an NRHP-listed building

== See also ==
- Search: archibald house
