= Fairfield Stags men's soccer =

Men's soccer team of Fairfield University

- Founded: 1964; 62 years ago
- University: Fairfield University
- Head coach: Krystian Witkowsk (1st season)
- Conference: MAAC
- Location: Fairfield, Connecticut, US
- Stadium: Lessing Field (capacity: 600)
- Nickname: Stags
- Colors: Red
Home	Away

NCAA tournament appearances
- 1999, 2006, 2008, 2011, 2017

Conference tournament championships
- 1999, 2006, 2008, 2011, 2017

Conference regular season championships
- 1998, 2005, 2006, 2011, 2017

The Fairfield Stags men's soccer team represents Fairfield University in Fairfield, Connecticut and competes in the Metro Atlantic Athletic Conference (MAAC) of NCAA Division I. The Stags play their home games at Lessing Field on the campus of Fairfield University. The team was ranked nationally in 1998 (24th), 2000 (15th), 2001 (12th), 2005 (24th), 2006 (15th) 2007 (17th) and 2011 (25th) and competed in the NCAA Division I Men's Soccer Tournament in 1999, 2006, 2008, and 2011. The 2006 team advanced to the second round in the NCAA Tournament after defeating in-state rival University of Connecticut, 2–1. The team also won the MAAC Championship Tournament in 1999, 2006, 2008, 2011, and 2017. Individually, ten players have earned Regional All-American honors including Mark Longwell '82 who was the first Stag to go on to play for the United States men's national soccer team and major professional soccer for the NASL Tampa Bay Rowdies. The Stags are currently coached by 1998 New England Coach of the Year Carl Rees.

== History ==
=== Dawn of the Stags ===
The Fairfield Stags men's soccer program first began in 1964. Fairfield University Athletic Hall of Famer James Kuhlmann was the founding coach who dedicated himself to the university and the development of the program over the next 24 years. Coach Kuhlmann's dedication and efforts culminated in the Stags becoming a routine MAAC contender in the 1980s with standout players Mark Longwell '82, who went on to play for the United States men's national soccer team and the NASL Tampa Bay Rowdies, and Alberto Zappala '82 leading the way.

=== Red Stags Rising ===
With Head Coach Carl Rees manning the helm over the past decade the Stags have been ranked among the nation's elite programs having produced seven NSCAA Regional All-Americans and achieved seven winning seasons, including double-digit win totals in five of the last 10 campaigns. In 1998, the Stags posted a program-high 15 wins, and earned a No. 24 national ranking, the first-ever top 25 poll appearance by any Fairfield University team. In 1999, the Stags won its first MAAC tournament title and the program's first NCAA play-in berth. In 2000, the Stags earned a No. 15 national ranking. In 2001, the Stags placed in the national rankings all but two weeks, hitting a program-high of number 12. In 2005, the Stags posted an unbeaten conference record (8-0-1) for the first time in school history and captured the MAAC regular-season championship. The Stags also garnered a national ranking in the 2005 polls, thanks in part to an unbeaten mark during the month of October (8-0-1).

=== 2006 season ===
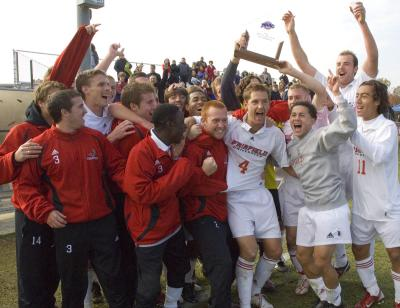
Fairfield players celebrating the 2006 MAAC championship

In 2006 the Stags became the first Fairfield team in any sport to advance past the first round of an NCAA Tournament, as they defeated UConn 2–1 in the NCAA Men's Soccer Championship in Storrs, CT. After winning the MAAC regular season and post season championship, the Stags, led by seniors Alex Cunliffe and Mike Troy, as well as juniors Tom Skara, J.P. Francini and Sam Bailey, entered the UConn game as the underdog. A goal by senior Jimmy Gaughan broke a 1–1 tie and solid goaltending from Francini kept the lead for Fairfield who upset the Huskies. The Stags lost to Towson in the second round, but will be remembered as one of the best athletic teams in school history.

== All-time head coaches ==
Years	Name	Record	Postseason
1964–1987	James Kuhlmann		–
1988–1995	Dejan Cokic		–
1996–	Carl Rees	115-68-28	1999 NCAA, 2006 NCAA, 2008 NCAA
Total		126-74-30	–

== Awards ==
=== Regional All-American ===
- (United States) Mark Longwell (1981)
- (Canada) Dave Mancini (2000)
- (Canada) Rob DeFaveri (2001)
- (New Zealand) Aaron Kingi (2001)
- (Canada) Justin Thompson (2002)
- (Northern Ireland) Bryan Harkin (2002)
- (Canada) Billy Androutsos (2004, 2005)
- (England) Alex Cunliffe (2004, 2006)
- (England) Sam Bailey (2006, 2007)
- (United States) Thomas Skara (2006, 2007)
- (United States) Matthew Uy (2007, 2008, 2009)

=== Regional Coach of the Year ===
- Carl Rees (NSCAA New England, 1998)

=== League Coach of the Year ===
- (Socialist Federal Republic of Yugoslavia) Dejan Cokic (MAAC, 1991, 1992)
- (England) Carl Rees (MAAC, 1998, 2011)

=== League Player of the Year ===
- (United States) Mark Longwell (Defensive, Tri-State, 1980, 1981)
- (United States) Jim McElderry (MAAC, 1992)
- (England) Alex Cunliffe (Co-Defensive, MAAC, 2003)
- (United States) Thomas Skara (Defensive, MAAC, 2006)
- (New Zealand) Michael O'Keeffe (Defensive, MAAC, 2011)
- (England) Jordan Ayris (Rookie, MAAC, 2011)

=== First Team All-League ===
- (United States) Mark Longwell (Tri-State, 1980, 1981)
- (United States) Jim McElderry (MAAC, 1991)
- (Canada) Adam Braz (MAAC, 2000)
- (Canada) Rob DeFaveri (MAAC, 2001)
- (United States) Mark Dietz (MAAC, 1999, 2001)
- (New Zealand) Aaron Kingi (MAAC, 2001)
- (Canada) Justin Thompson (MAAC, 2002)
- (Northern Ireland) Bryan Harkin (MAAC, 2002)
- (New Zealand) Danny Atwell (MAAC, 2003)
- (United States) Andrew Frankel (MAAC, 2003, 2005)
- (England) Alex Cunliffe (MAAC, 2004, 2006)
- (Canada) Billy Androutsos (MAAC, 2005)
- (United States) Jon Paul Francini (MAAC, 2006)
- (United States) Thomas Skara (MAAC, 2006)
- (England) Sam Bailey (MAAC, 2007)
- (United States) Christian Uy (MAAC, 2008)
- (Canada) Todd Rutledge (MAAC, 2010)
- (New Zealand) Michael O'Keeffe (MAAC, 2011)
- (New Zealand) Jonny Raj (MAAC, 2011)
- (England) Jon Clement (MAAC, 2011)
- (England) Jordan Ayris (MAAC, 2011)

== All-Time statistic leaders ==
=== Career leaders ===
- Points: (England) Sam Bailey (70, 2004–2007)
- Goals: (England) Sam Bailey (27, 2004–2007)
- Assists: (England) Barry O'Driscoll (20, 1996–1999)
- Lowest Goal Against Average: (New Zealand) Roger Noll (0.92, 1999–2001)
- Shutouts: (New Zealand) Roger Noll (20, 1999–2001)

=== Single-season leaders ===
- Points: (England) Barry O'Driscoll (29, 1999)
- Goals: (England) James Gledhill (12, 2001)
- Assists: (Northern Ireland) Bryan Harkin (9, 2000)
- Lowest Goal Against Average: (United States) Andrew Frankel (0.61, 2005)
- Shutouts: (England) Danny Glynn (9, 1998) and (New Zealand) Roger Noll (20, 2000)

== Stags in the pros ==
Player	Year	Team/s
Vasilis Androutsos	2005	Montreal Impact
Adam Braz	2001	Canadian National Team, Toronto FC
Rob DeFaveri	2002	Montreal Impact
James Hunt	2004	Long Island Rough Riders
Justin Thompson	2003	Portland Timbers, Worcester City, Virginia Beach Mariners, Toronto Lynx
Bryan Harkin	2002	Crystal Palace FC USA
Lee Williams	1999	Toronto Lynx
Jim McElderry	1993	New York Fever, Long Island Rough Riders
Mark Longwell	1982	United States National Team, Tampa Bay Rowdies, Ft. Lauderdale Suns
Thomas Skara	2010	Melbourne Knights
Matt Turner	2015	Richmond Kickers, New England Revolution, Arsenal, Nottingham Forest
