= Joseph D. Macchia =

Founder and president of GAINSCO Inc

Joseph D. Macchia (born New York, New York) is the founder and former president and chief executive officer of GAINSCO, Inc., a property and casualty insurance holding company. Macchia founded GAINSCO in 1978 after borrowing $500,000 from a local bank in Fort Worth, Texas. In 1992, he was named entrepreneur of the year for the Southwest Region's Service Category by Inc. magazine. In 1995, Forbes magazine, for the fifth time, named GAINSCO under Macchia's leadership one of the 200 best small companies in America.

He was previously president of the Early American Insurance Company and vice president of the Foremost Insurance Company. After serving in the Marine Corps for four years as a first lieutenant, Macchia earned his bachelor's degree from Fairfield University in 1957 and completed graduate studies at Western University. Macchia began serving as a member of the board of trustees at Fairfield University in 1997.
