= Peter J. Pestillo =

American business executive

Peter J. Pestillo (born March 22, 1938, in Bristol, Connecticut, United States) is the former chairman and CEO of Visteon based in Dearborn, Michigan, from January 1, 2000, to May 31, 2004. Pestillo became the first CEO and chairman of the Visteon when it was spun off from Ford Motor Company. The new company was created in an effort headed by Pestillo.

Pestillo was the honorary chairman of the Motorsports Hall of Fame of America in 2001.

== Career ==
Pestillo began his career holding several industrial relations positions at General Electric. In July 1974 he became vice president of employee relations at B.F. Goodrich. In January 1980, Pestillo joined the Ford Motor Company as vice president of labor relations. Five years later, he became the company's vice president of employee relations. He added external affairs to his responsibilities in 1986. Pestillo was named Ford's vice president of corporate relations and diversified businesses in 1990 and in 1993 became its executive vice president for corporate relations. In January 1999, he was named Ford's vice chairman and chief of staff.

== Education ==
Pestillo received his bachelor's degree in economic from Fairfield University in 1960 and his law degree from the Georgetown University Law Center in 1963. He attended the Harvard Business School six-week Advanced Management Program.
