= Shawn Matthews =

American businessman

- Born: April 2, 1967 (age 59); Bridgeport, Connecticut, U.S.
- Education: Fairfield University (BS); Hofstra University (MBA)
- Years active: 2018–present
- Employer: Hondius Capital Management
- Known for: Trading
- Title: Hedge Fund Manager

Shawn Matthews is an American businessman in the financial services industry. He is currently the Founder and Chief Investment Officer of Hondius Capital Management, a global asset manager, and the former CEO of Cantor Fitzgerald & Co.

== Career ==
From 2009 to 2018, Matthews served as the CEO and President of Cantor Fitzgerald & Co., with oversight of over 100 Cantor affiliated entities, running the spectrum of financial services and fintech. During his tenure as CEO, he built Cantor's risk taking businesses, shepherded the firm through the crisis and subsequently guided it through an extended period of significant growth. He was instrumental in growing Cantor into 1 of only 22 Primary Government bond traders of the U.S. Treasury. Cantor Fitzgerald and its affiliates/subsidiaries have grown exponentially since 2009. He is a frequent guest on CNBC, Fox Business and Bloomberg News and is quoted as a reliable source on financial markets by major financial news outlets. Prior to being appointed CEO in 2009, he served in senior management roles, including Head of Capital Markets and Head of Mortgage Trading. Matthews started at Cantor Fitzgerald & Co. in 2005. His career began at Wertheim Schroeder & Co. in 1990. Since that time, Matthews was the managing member of West Side Capital, a broker-dealer, as well as the managing partner of Alchemist Capital Management, a hedge fund. In April 2018, Matthews departed Cantor to start his own hedge fund, Hondius Capital. Anshu Jain, formerly of Deutsche Bank, succeeded him as president at Cantor Fitzgerald.

Matthews was a member of the board of directors of Autism Speaks and formerly the Securities Industry and Financial Markets Association.

== Education ==
Matthews received his Bachelor of Science in finance from the Fairfield University Dolan School of Business and MBA from Hofstra University.
