= Francis J. Tedesco =

American medical educator

Francis J. Tedesco (born c. 1943 in Derby, Connecticut) served as the President of the Medical College of Georgia from July 1, 1988, until his retirement on February 1, 2001.

During his presidency, the university expanded with more research programs, clinical care centers and buildings. The quality of education also increased during his presidency with competitive admission and most students passing their board exams. The American Society for Gastrointestinal Endoscopy awarded Tedesco the 1993 Rudolf Schindler Award, its highest distinction in recognition of his contributions to gastrointestinal endoscopy.

Tedesco joined the Medical College of Georgia faculty in 1978 as Associate Professor of Medicine and Chief, Section of Gastroenterology, Department of Medicine. He was promoted to Professor in 1981. He served as Acting Vice President for Clinical Activities for a period of time before assuming the permanent role in 1984. He served as Interim Dean, School of Medicine, from 1986 to 1988.

Tedesco graduated from high school in Fairfield, Connecticut, in 1961, Fairfield University (cum laude) in 1965, and the St. Louis University School of Medicine (cum laude) in 1969. He is a diplomate of the National Board of Medical Examiners and the American Board of Internal Medicine with certification in gastroenterology.
