= John Jantsch =

American author, speaker and marketing consultant

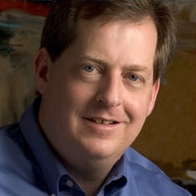
- Born: April 2, 1960 (age 66)
- Education: University of Kansas
- Occupations: Writer, speaker, marketer
- Writing career
- Genre: Business
- Notable works: Duct Tape Marketing; The Referral Engine; The Commitment Engine

John Jantsch (born April 2, 1960) is an author, speaker, and marketing consultant who specializes in assisting small businesses.

He is the author of Duct Tape Marketing, The Referral Engine, and The Commitment Engine.

== Early career ==
Jantsch grew up in Kansas City and attended the University of Kansas. In 2002, Jantsch created the Duct Tape Marketing System, which trains and licenses small business consultants. Two years later he added the Duct Tape Marketing Consultant Network.

Duct Tape Marketing offers marketing workshops and consulting to small businesses looking to expand. Jantsch suggests treating small business marketing systematically and not creating individual "marketing events." One way to do this, Jantsch says, is to maintain a strong and consistent internet presence through blogs, social media, and forums tailored to small business interests.

== Author ==
=== Duct Tape Marketing ===
In 2007, Jantsch published Duct Tape Marketing: The World's Most Practical Small Business Marketing Guide, which outlines his systematic approach to marketing. The book is divided into three parts. Part I is titled "The Duct Tape Foundation—The Way to Sticky Marketing" and deals with laying the groundwork for a successful marketing system. Part II is titled "The Duct Tape Lead Generation Machine—Turning Stickiness Into a System That Works for You" and it focuses on implementing the strategies of Part I. Part III is titled "Getting on a Roll!" and it serves as a conclusion meant to ground the preceding two parts.

Michael Gerber said Duct Tape Marketing is "just like its namesake – Duct Tape – it's good, incredibly smart, amazingly practical, and immensely sticky stuff." Duct Tape Marketing Revised & Updated was published in 2011.

=== The Referral Engine ===
In 2010, Jantsch published The Referral Engine: Teaching Your Business to Market Itself. The book outlines an approach to marketing that moves away from complicated marketing campaigns and instead focuses on personal interactions with customers through outlets such as social media and friend-to-friend word of mouth. The idea, Jantsch writes, is that a business should always focus on and understand the importance of referrals.

The Referral Engine was a Wall Street Journal bestseller, a Small Business Trends "Editor's Choice Best Business Books 2010," Library Journal's "Best Marketing Book 2010," and was on 800-CEO-READ's "Best Business Book of 2010" shortlist.

=== The Commitment Engine ===
The Commitment Engine: Making Work Worth It is directed at helping business owners establish lasting commitment in their employees, customers, and businesses and examines what makes some businesses worth referring. The book diagnosis the key qualities of successful, "effortless" business approaches.

The Commitment Engine has been featured in Forbes, CNBC, The New York Enterprise Report, and was reviewed positively by Trust Agents author Chris Brogan. Jantsch has given a TEDx talk about the book.

=== "SEO for Growth" ===
In 2016 John Jantsch and co-author Phil Singleton published SEO for Growth - The Ultimate Guide for Marketers, Web Designers, and Entrepreneurs. The book is aimed at teaching marketers, designers and entrepreneurs the strategic nature of search engine optimization as well as the SEO forces at play in web design and social media. Excerpts from SEO for Growth have appeared in Entrepreneur, Copyblogger, and Search Engine Journal as well as on MSNBC.

=== The Self-Reliant Entrepreneur ===
Source:

== Reception ==
Jantsch's Duct Tape Marketing blog was chosen as a Forbes favorite for marketing and small business and his Duct Tape Marketing podcast was called a "must listen" by Fast Company magazine. Jantsch has delivered keynote speeches to organizations such as American Express, Microsoft, Verizon, HP, and eBay. He also is the featured marketing contributor to American Express OPENForum.

Jantsch's small business advice has been featured in New York Times, Wall St. Journal, and CNNMoney among others. Seth Godin called Jantsch the "Peter Drucker of small business tactics."

== Bibliography ==
- Duct Tape Marketing, Thomas Nelson– 2007, 2011 ISBN 1591843111
- The Referral Engine, Portfolio– 2010 ISBN 1595554653
- The Commitment Engine, Portfolio– 2012 ISBN 1591844878
- "Duct Tape Selling", Portfolio– 2014 ISBN 1591846331
- "SEO for Growth", SEO for Growth– 2016 ISBN 0692769447
- "The Self-Reliant Entrepreneur", Wiley– 2019 ISBN 1119579775
- "The Ultimate Marketing Engine", HarperCollins Leadership– 2021 ISBN 1400224772
