= Michael G. Archbold =

American businessman

Michael G. (Mike) Archbold
- Education: Fairfield, B.S.
- Years active: 2014-2016
- Employer: GNC (NYSE: GNC)
- Title: Former CEO

Michael G. (Mike) Archbold is an American businessman in the retail industry and the former chief executive officer of GNC.

== Career ==
Prior to GNC, Archbold was chief executive officer of Talbots from August 2012 to August 2014. He also was the president of The Vitamin Shoppe from April 2011 to June 2012. In addition, Archbold was chief financial officer at Saks Fifth Avenue and AutoZone.

== Education ==
Archbold received his bachelor's of science degree in accounting from the Fairfield University Dolan School of Business in 1982.
