= Joseph D. Sargent =

American businessman (1937–2016)

Joseph Dudley Sargent (April 16, 1937 – November 1, 2016) was an American businessman, president, chief executive officer, and chairman of the board of The Guardian Life Insurance Company of America. Sargent was born in Bryn Mawr, Pennsylvania, the son of Gerald Thomas Sargent from Bar Harbor, Maine, and Honora Oliver from County Mayo, Ireland. His family moved to Fairfield, Connecticut, where he became a student at Fairfield College Preparatory School. Sargent joined Guardian in 1959, immediately following his graduation from Fairfield University. He spent his entire career with Guardian, previously having held the offices of senior vice president of health insurance, senior vice president of individual life insurance and executive vice president.

Sargent continued to serve on the board of directors at Guardian until 2009. He also served as treasurer and a member of the board of directors for United Way of New York City. He was a trustee of the Discovery Museum Foundation of Bridgeport, Connecticut and was a member of the advisory council of the Charles F. Dolan School of Business at Fairfield University.

He was a recipient of the Ellis Island Medal of Honor as authorized by the U.S. Congress, and the Alumni Professional Achievement Award from Fairfield University.

Sargent died on November 1, 2016, at the age of 79.
