= Mark Young (basketball) =

American basketball player

Personal information
- Born: Newton, Massachusetts, U.S.
- Listed height: 6 ft 10 in (2.08 m)
- Listed weight: 238 lb (108 kg)

Career information
- High school: Brookline (Brookline, Massachusetts)
- College: Fairfield (1975–1979)
- NBA draft: 1979: 2nd round, 41st overall pick
- Drafted by: Los Angeles Lakers
- Position: Center
- Stats at Basketball Reference

Mark Young is an American former professional basketball player. He played college basketball for the Fairfield Stags where he holds program records for total free throws made and attempted. Young was selected in the second round of the 1979 NBA draft by the Los Angeles Lakers and played professionally in Europe.

== High school career ==
Young attended Brookline High School in Brookline, Massachusetts. As a senior, he was named New England's Athlete of the Year, while averaging 30.9 points and 18 rebounds per game. He finished his high school career with over 1,500 points and set a single-game school record with 42 points scored.

== College career ==
Young accepted a basketball scholarship from Fairfield University, over Duke University and the College of the Holy Cross, to play under head coach Fred Barakat. He was a teammate of Joe DeSantis and became a four-year starter at center. As a sophomore, he contributed to the team having a 13–0 record at home. He tallied 19 rebounds against Merrimack College.

As a junior, he ranked sixth nationally in field goal percentage (.629), which was also a New England record, after making 149 of 237 attempts. He averaged 17.1 points and 7.4 rebounds per contest. His best game came against the University of Dayton in the 1978 National Invitation Tournament, where he scored 32 points.

As a senior, he led the Stags in scoring (20.9) and rebounding (9.0), while setting a school single-season record with 193 free throws made and becoming the fifth player in school history to surpass 800 career rebounds.

Young left school as the second all-time leading scorer (1,643 points), fifth in rebounds (808), third in field goal percentage (.558), holding Fairfield records in free throws made (543) and attempted (697). He played in 106 games and scored over 30 points in five of those contests.

In 1985, he was inducted as a member of the Fairfield Athletic Hall of Fame. In 2017, he was named to the Metro Atlantic Athletic Conference (MAAC) Honor Roll.

== Professional career ==
Young was selected by the Los Angeles Lakers in the second round (41st overall) of the 1979 NBA draft. He was released before the start of the season and never played in the National Basketball Association (NBA). He played in Europe during the 1979–80 season. Young signed with Maccabi Haifa B.C. of the Israeli Basketball Premier League in 1981.

== Career statistics ==
Legend
GP	Games played	GS	Games started	MPG	Minutes per game
FG%	Field goal percentage	3P%	3-point field goal percentage	FT%	Free throw percentage
RPG	Rebounds per game	APG	Assists per game	SPG	Steals per game
BPG	Blocks per game	PPG	Points per game	**Bold**	Career high

=== College ===
Year	Team	GP	GS	MPG	FG%	3P%	FT%	RPG	APG	SPG	BPG	PPG
1975–76	Fairfield	26	–	–	.509	–	.696	7.0	.5	–	–	11.0
1976–77	Fairfield	**27**	–	–	.494	–	.744	7.2	.3	–	–	13.0
1977–78	Fairfield	**27**	–	–	.**629**	–	**.811**	7.4	.4	–	–	17.1
1978–79	Fairfield	26	–	–	.587	–	**.811**	**9.0**	**1.0**	–	–	**20.9**
Career		106	–	–	.558	–	.779	7.6	.5	–	–	15.5
