= Cappelli =

Cappelli is a surname. Notable people with the surname include:

- Alexander Cappelli (born 1984), Australian musician and actor
- Dante Cappelli (1866–1948), Italian actor
- Elena Bianchini-Cappelli (1873–1919), Italian dramatic soprano opera singer
- Francesco Cappelli (born 1943), retired Italian professional football player
- Frank Cappelli (1852–1918), the star of the children's television series Cappelli & Company
- Gari Cappelli (born 1961), Croatian politician
- Giulio Cappelli (1911–1995), Italian football (soccer) player
- Gregory W. Cappelli (born c. 1968), American business executive
- Peter Cappelli (born 1956), American economist
- Raffaele Cappelli (1848–1921), Italian politician and diplomat
- Steven W. Cappelli (born 1963), American politician

== See also ==
- A.F. Cappelli Block, historic site at 263 Atwells Avenue in Providence, Rhode Island
- Cappelli & Company, American children's television series
