= Oak Park and River Forest High School =

Public school in Oak Park, Illinois, US

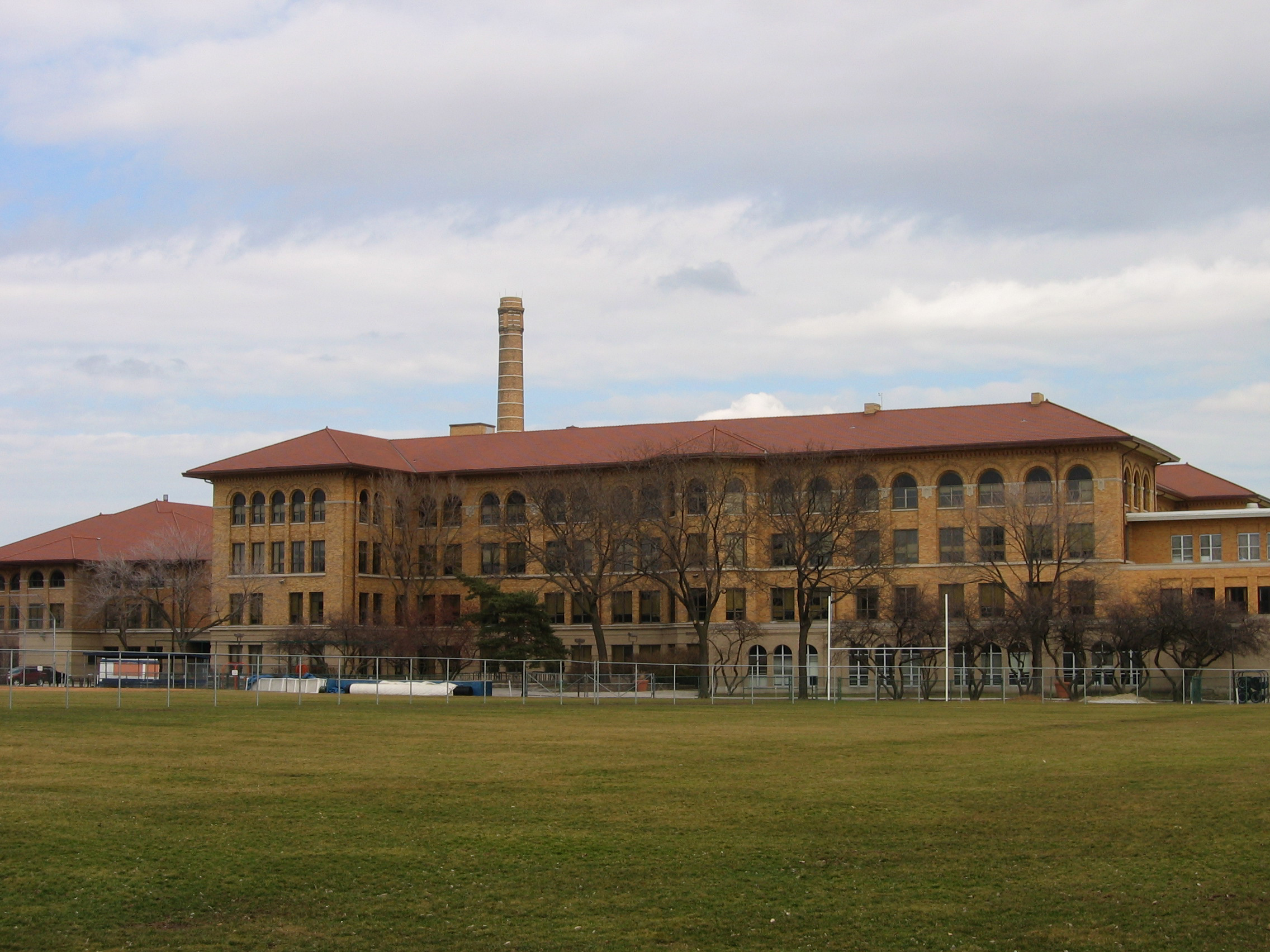

Location
- 201 N. Scoville Avenue; Oak Park, Cook County, Illinois 60302; United States; 41.8903°N 87.7888°W

Information
- Type: Public secondary school
- Motto: Greek: ΤΑ Γ'ΑΡΙΣΤΑ (Those things that are best)
- Established: 1871
- Status: Open
- School district: Oak Park and River Forest High School District 200
- NCES District ID: 1729280
- Superintendent: Dr. Greg Johnson
- School code: IL-06-016-2000-13-0601620000001
- CEEB code: 143245
- NCES School ID: 172928003070
- Teaching staff: 241.88 (FTE)
- Grades: 9–12
- Gender: Coeducational
- Enrollment: 3,307 (2024–2025)
  - Grade 9: 853
  - Grade 10: 801
  - Grade 11: 794
  - Grade 12: 859
- Student to teacher ratio: 13.67
- Campus type: Suburban
- Colors: Burnt orange Navy
- Song: "Oak Park Loyalty"
- Athletics conference: West Suburban Conference
- Mascot: Hemmy the Huskie
- Nickname: Huskies
- USNWR ranking: 848
- Publication: Crest
- Newspaper: Trapeze
- Yearbook: Tabula
- Nobel laureates: Ernest Hemingway
- Website: oprfhs.org

Oak Park and River Forest High School (OPRF) is a public four-year high school located in Oak Park, a suburb of Chicago, Illinois. It is the only school in Oak Park and River Forest District 200. Founded in 1871, the current school building opened in 1907.

== History ==
OPRF has been listed six times on Newsweek's top 1500 American public schools, as measured by the Challenge Index. In 2009, the school was ranked #549. In previous years, the school was ranked No. 554 (2003), No. 590 (2005), No. 501 (2006), No. 688 (2007), and No. 379 (2008).

== Boundary ==
The boundary of the school district, which is also the attendance boundary of the high school, includes all of Oak Park and almost all of the area of River Forest (the remaining part of River Forest is zoned for recreational/institutional use). The feeder school districts are Oak Park Elementary School District 97 and River Forest School District 90.

== Traditions ==
=== School crest ===
The school's crest is a shield divided into three sections. The top left section depicts an acorn cradled in the leaves of an oak tree. The bottom section consists of horizontal wavy lines, suggesting a flowing river, while the right section depicts a group of three trees which represents a park or forest (thus incorporating the town names "Oak Park and River Forest"). The top left section is separated from the other two sections by a wide divider inscribed with the school's motto ΤΑ Γ'ΑΡΙΣΤΑ (Those things that are best). The crest has been a symbol of the school since 1908.

=== Scholarship Cup ===
Instead of having a valedictorian, the high school presents the Scholarship Cup. This is an award presented to the graduating seniors with the highest weighted GPA in their graduating class after the seventh semester of enrollment (though transfer students remain eligible for the award, provided they have been in attendance for five semesters before the Cup is awarded.

== Academics ==
In 2024, OPRF had an average composite SAT score of 1131.7, with an average of 579.8 on the ELA portion and a 551.9 on the math portion and graduated 96.5% of its senior class.

The following Advanced Placement courses are offered (not complete list):

Course	Notes	Course	Notes
Economics	one class covering Microeconomics & Macroeconomics	English Language and Composition	
Art History		English Literature and Composition	
Studio Art		Music Theory	
American History		Government	
European History		Psychology	
Statistics		Calculus	separate courses in AB & BC
Computer Science	AB	Environmental Science	
Chemistry		Biology	
Physics	C	French	
Italian		Spanish	
Government		Government	

== Student life ==
=== The arts ===
The school sponsors several organizations related to studying or performing in the arts.

On October 31, 1907, the school's orchestra was founded. While more common today, Oak Park was one of the first schools to offer credit toward graduation based on student performance in the orchestra.

Among the school's music and song groups are a gospel choir, a vocal jazz group, two jazz bands, a jazz combo, a marching band & color guard, and a pep band. The school also has three choirs during the school day: a Treble Choir, a Chorale, a Chamber Choir, and an A Cappella Choir. The school also has three small audition-only student-run groups, which include 5–6 members each. These are Take 5 (boys only), Six Chicks (girls only), and No Strings (girls only). There are also medium-sized groups that are school-sponsored, and a show choir. It also has a concert band, symphonic band, wind symphony, wind ensemble, two concert orchestras, and a symphony orchestra.

The school supports a dance team in addition to a drill team and an orchesis group.

The school supports eleven stage productions each year, including four in the "Little Theatre," four in the black box "Studio 200" space, a summer and winter musical, and a one-act festival. In support of these, the school not only sponsors a stage crew group for students but a theatrical makeup group as well. Student performers who excel in their performance may be inducted into the school's chapter of the International Thespian Society. The Studio 200 group supports students interested in gaining experience in all aspects of theatrical production from acting and directing to publicity and the technical arts.

Among the plastic arts the school supports an overarching arts club in addition to a photography club and wheel throwing club which emphasizes pottery.

The School has a speech team that participates in the IHSA State series.

The school also has an annual literary and arts publication, The Crest, which has been active since 1893 and displays student-submitted art and poetry and is published and distributed to students toward the end of every school year. It is one of the oldest high school literary journals in the country.

The school has one of the country's oldest continuous high school television news programs, Newscene, founded in 1982. The television program won a Cable ACE in 1983 for innovative programming for Extra-Help an early live interactive program. Today the school's high-definition television studio hosts numerous productions, including the award-winning weekly newsmagazine show Newscene Live, airing throughout the metro area on Comcast Cable.

In January 2018, a docuseries entitled America to Me premiered at the Sundance film festival. Director Steve James and his team followed several OPRF students throughout the 2015–2016 school year to explore the relationship between race and education.

=== Activities and clubs ===
OPRF offers over 60 clubs and activities ranging from athletic and artistic to competitive academic, cultural, and social awareness.

Among the clubs which are affiliates or chapters of notable national organizations are ASPIRA, Best Buddies, Business Professionals of America, Cum Laude Society, and Family, Career, and Community Leaders of America (FCCLA).

An intramural program sponsors both competitive round robin and free play competitions in basketball, badminton, ultimate frisbee, dodgeball, and flag football.

The following non-athletic teams have won their respective IHSA-sponsored state competition or tournament:

- Chess: 1984–85
- Debate: 1982–83, 1983–84

=== Athletics ===
OPRF competes in the West Suburban Conference. The school is also a member of the Illinois High School Association (IHSA), which governs most sports and competitive activities. The school's teams are stylized as the Huskies.

The school sponsors interscholastic teams for young men and women in: basketball cross country, soccer, swimming and diving, tennis, track and field, volleyball, and water polo. Young men may compete in baseball, golf, football, and wrestling, while women may compete in badminton, cheerleading, gymnastics, and softball. While not sponsored by the IHSA, the school also sponsors teams for young men and women in lacrosse, in addition to a field hockey and drill team for young women. While not sponsored by the school, there is an ice hockey team affiliated with the school.

By school policy, athletes must maintain a "D" average (1.0 GPA) to compete and practice. If in any week, an athlete has any cumulative grade in any course that is not a minimum of a "D", that student is required to attend an academic support program for a minimum of 10 minutes the following week. Any athlete finishing two consecutive quarters of study with a failing grade are ineligible for athletic participation.

The following teams have won their respective IHSA-sponsored state championship tournament or meet:

IHSA State Championships for Oak Park-River Forest HS
Sport	State Championships
Baseball:	1941–42, 1980–81, 2011–12
Softball:	2004–05, 2015–16, 2016–17
Swimming and diving (boys):	1997–98
Swimming and diving (girls):	1988–89, 1989–90
Tennis (boys):	1940–41, 1944–45, 1947–48, 1948–49, 1949–50, 1950–51, 1951–52, 1952–53, 1953–54, 1968–69, 1970–71
Tennis (girls):	1972–73, 1973–74, 1974–75, 1975–76, 1985–86, 1986–87
Track and field (boys):	1906–07, 1907–08, 1912–13, 1914–15, 1918–19, 1919–20, 1922–23, 1923–24, 1929–30, 1930–31, 1931–32, 1936–37, 1937–38, 1941–42, 1944–45, 1946–47, 1986–87, 2023-2024
Track and field (girls):	1974–75
Volleyball (girls):	1978–79, 1979–80
Wrestling:	2008–09, 2013–14, 2014–15, 2015–16, 2024-2025, 2025-2026

In the school's early history, there were semi-annual "field days" in which students competed for various prizes (medals, cups, sporting equipment, cakes) in events such as the hammer throw, three-legged race, sack race, and obstacle course. In the absence of regularly scheduled interscholastic meets, the Cook County High School Athletic Union hosted an annual field day which would involve top athletes from the county schools.

From 1900 to 1913, Oak Park was a member of the Cook County League. In 1913, the schools outside of Chicago were expelled, and formed the Suburban League, which would eventually splinter off into several smaller leagues, one of which was the West Suburban Conference.

Before this was made illegal by the IHSA, Oak Park, on at least one occasion, played games against college teams, such as a baseball game on April 4, 1900, when Oak Park lost to Northwestern University (then known as the Purple), 1–27.

In 1927, the school constructed a 219 ft x 128 ft (67 m x 39 m) fieldhouse at a cost of $750,000. It contained four inside gymnasiums, two swimming pools, an indoor track, and seating for 1,000 people. The facility helped Oak Park build a champion track program and helped other area schools promote indoor track and field as a sport.

Through the end of the 2008–09 school year, the boys track & field program holds state records for state championships, top 3 finishes, and top ten finishes. Starting in 1930, the school hosted the "Oak Park Relays", a track & field competition that grew into the largest in the Midwest, with nearly 1,500 athletes from 63 school competing in 1960. In 1963, the field was 1,340 athletes from 77 schools, and was now the largest high school indoor track meet in the United States. By 1964, the field rose to over 1,900 athletes from 95 schools. Despite the school's successes in track & field, the school did not have an outdoor track, and by 1998, the indoor cinder track was no longer in competitive condition. The school entered into a partnership with Fenwick High School and Concordia University to construct a new outdoor track on the campus of the university.

The OPRF lacrosse program is one of the three oldest high school programs in the state of Illinois.

While water polo would not be sponsored by the IHSA until 2002, Oak Park High School sponsored a team at least as early as 1901, playing a match against the Armour Institute (later renamed the Illinois Institute of Technology).

In 1905, in the wake of a student killed in a football game, Oak Park's (and several other schools') school board voted to cancel the remainder of the season and ban football from the school. In 1907, football was restored in Cook County, however Oak Park refused to rejoin the league. Instead, Oak Park competed as an independent team.

From 1904 to 1906, Danny Roberts was the state champion among the roughly 300 girls' teams in the state. In 1907, the Illinois State High School Athletic Association (previous name of the IHSA), banned all girls from participating in inter-school basketball because "roughness is not foreign to the game, and that the exercise in public is immodest and not altogether ladylike." Oak Park was thus denied a fourth state title.

OPRF was, with DePaul University, one of two sites for men's and women basketball games during the 1959 Pan American Games.

In 1961, the pool at OPRF was used for the annual Canadian-American Invitational swim meet. Among those competing were Tom Stock, Ted Stickles, and Joan Spillane.

== Notable alumni ==
=== Letters and journalism ===
- Kenneth Fearing, poet, novelist (The Big Clock) and founder of The Partisan Review
- Michael Gerber, author of the Barry Trotter series and parodies of the Harry Potter books; humorist whose work has appeared in The Yale Record, The New Yorker, The Atlantic and Saturday Night Live
- Tavi Gevinson, founder and editor-in-chief of Rookie Magazine
- Jane Hamilton, novelist (The Book of Ruth, A Map of the World)
- Paul Harvey, Jr., radio news writer, producer, and on-air talent best known for his work with The Rest of the Story, which was long hosted by his father
- Ernest Hemingway, Nobel Prize- and Pulitzer Prize-winning writer
- George Gruhn, author and expert on vintage American guitars; founder of Gruhn Guitars
- Janet Lewis, librettist, poet, and novelist (The Wife of Martin Guerre)
- Michelle McNamara, freelance writer, crime blogger, author of I'll Be Gone in the Dark: One Woman's Obsessive Search for the Golden State Killer
- Barbara Mertz, bestselling writer of more than 60 mysteries under the pen names Elizabeth Peters and Barbara Michaels
- Francis Morrone, an architectural historian known for his work on the built environment of New York City
- Bruce Morton, Emmy- and Peabody Award-winning television journalist, spending most of his career with CBS News
- Morris McNeal Musselman, screenwriter and author; a classmate of Ernest Hemingway, and collaborated on what is believed to be Hemingway's first play, Hokum
- Carol Shields, author (Larry's Party, Unless) who won the 1995 Pulitzer Prize for Fiction (The Stone Diaries)
- Charles Simic, poet; 1990 Pulitzer Prize for Poetry; named Poet Laureate Consultant in Poetry to the Library of Congress (formerly Poet Laureate of the United States) in 2007
- Robert St. John, journalist, historian, news broadcaster, and author of 23 books
- Anna Louise Strong, journalist, writer, traveler, and communist apologist
- Edward Wagenknecht, author and literary critic

=== Fine and performing arts ===
- Heléne Alexopoulos, ballet dancer; principal dancer with the New York City Ballet
- Dan Castellaneta, actor best known for providing the voice of Homer Simpson on the television series The Simpsons
- Bruce Davidson, documentary photographer, best known for his coverage of the American Civil Rights Movement
- Paul Dinello, writer, director, producer and actor
- Amir El Saffar, musician
- Eleanor Friedberger, of the Fiery Furnaces
- Matthew Friedberger, of the Fiery Furnaces
- Mason Gamble, actor (Dennis the Menace, Rushmore)
- Kathy Griffin, comedian and actress (Suddenly Susan, Kathy Griffin: My Life on the D-List)
- Kara Jackson, National Youth Poet Laureate and musician
- John La Montaine, composer; 1959 Pulitzer Prize for Music
- Felicity LaFortune, actress
- Thomas Lennon, actor (Reno 911!, The State) and screenwriter (Night at the Museum)
- Ted Levine, an actor known for the film The Silence of the Lambs and the television series Monk
- Ludacris, rapper, entrepreneur and actor
- Mary Elizabeth Mastrantonio, actress best known for her work in film (The Abyss, Scarface, White Sands)
- Jeff Mauro, host of the Food Network series Sandwich King and $24 in 24
- William F. May, chemical engineer and businessman; co-founded the Film Society of Lincoln Center
- Amy Morton, actress
- Martin Pearlman, conductor and composer; founder and director of Boston Baroque, America's oldest period-instrument orchestra
- George Schaefer, Tony Award-winning director of stage and television
- Cecily Strong, cast member on Saturday Night Live; attended Oak Park and River Forest High School before transferring to the Chicago Academy for the Arts for her senior year
- Alex Wurman, composer
- Megan Cavanagh, actress from A League of Their Own

=== Science ===
- Richard C. Atkinson, psychologist; director of the National Science Foundation; chancellor of the University of California, San Diego; president of the University of California
- Wallace S. Broecker, geologist, perhaps best known for coining the phrase "global warming"
- Winifred Cameron, astronomer at NASA 1959–1984
- James Bennett Griffin is regarded as one of the most influential North American archaeologists in the 20th century. He was professor of anthropology at the University of Michigan.
- Peter J. Hansen, animal scientist and distinguished professor at the University of Florida known for his work in domestic animal embryo transfer and reproductive biology
- James B. Herrick, medical doctor; the first to identify sickle cell anemia and coronary thrombosis
- Kermit E Krantz, surgeon, physician, author, and inventor; co-developed the Marshall-Marchetti-Krantz procedure
- Wilton Krogman, professor of anthropology at the University of Chicago and University of Pennsylvania
- Peter N. Peregrine, archaeologist and cross-cultural researcher specializing in cultural evolution.
- Jay Ruby, anthropologist specializing in the field of visual anthropology
- Susan Subak, environmental scientist and author working on climate change
- James Thomson, biologist best known for his work with human embryonic stem cells
- Chad Trujillo, astronomer and co-discoverer of several Trans-Neptunian objects including Quaoar, Sedna, Orcus, and Eris

=== Sports ===
- Johnny Barrett, former NFL player
- Don Canham, track and field coach at the University of Michigan before becoming its athletic director (1968–1988)
- Leo Chappell, former NFL player
- Ellis Coleman, 2012 Olympian in wrestling
- Jim Dewar, former NFL player
- Alfred Eissler, former NFL player
- Dallis Flowers, NFL cornerback for the Indianapolis Colts. He played college football at Grand View and Pittsburg State.
- Milt Ghee, former NFL player
- Greg Guy, 1992–93 NCAA Division I men's basketball scoring champion
- Robert Halperin, 1960 Rome Olympic bronze medal winner and 1963 Pan American Games gold medal yachting medalist; college and professional football player; one of Chicago's most-decorated World War II heroes; chairman of Commercial Light Co., and a co-founder of Lands' End.
- Charlie Hoag, member of the 1952 gold medal U.S. Men's Olympic Basketball team
- Brandon Knight, NFL player
- Reynold Kraft, former NFL player
- Eric Kumerow, football player for Ohio State and a first-round draft pick of the NFL's Miami Dolphins
- Sean Lawrence, pitcher (1998) with the Pittsburgh Pirates
- Emery Lehman, speed skater who participated in the 2014 Winter Olympics, 2018 Winter Olympics, and 2022 Winter Olympics (bronze medal at the 2022 Olympics)
- Gabe Levin (born 1994), American-Israeli basketball player in the Israeli Basketball Premier League
- Jay MacDowell, former NFL player
- Billy Martin (did not graduate), professional tennis player; UCLA head coach since 1994
- Bob Nussbaumer, player and coach in the NFL
- Ben Shelton, outfielder (1993) with the Pittsburgh Pirates
- Iman Shumpert, basketball player for the Sacramento Kings; member of the 2016 NBA championship-winning Cleveland Cavaliers; drafted by the New York Knicks as 17th pick of the 2011 NBA draft
- Gerry Sullivan, former NFL player
- Len Teeuws, former NFL player
- George Trafton, NFL center, playing his entire career for the Decatur Staleys/Chicago Bears; member of two championship teams; credited with introducing the one-handed snap; inducted into the Pro Football Hall of Fame
- Danielle Tyler, softball player for gold medal U.S. team at 1996 Summer Olympics
- Walter Voigt, former NFL player
- Paul Walker, football player for Yale and the NFL's New York Giants
- Frank Wickhorst, college football player for the Army Cadets in the 1920s and member of the College Football Hall of Fame

=== Other ===
- Bruce Barton, U.S. Congressman (1937–1941), author (The Man Nobody Knows), and ad executive
- Gregory W. Cappelli, CEO of Apollo Group, which owns the University of Phoenix, the largest for-profit higher education institution in the US
- Mike Feinberg, co-founder of Knowledge Is Power Program
- GAWNE, rapper, singer, and songwriter
- Walter Burley Griffin, architect and city planner best known for designing the capital city of Australia, Canberra, as well as the development of the carport and "L-shaped floor plan"
- Otto Kerner, Jr., 33rd Governor of Illinois (1961–1968); namesake of the national Kerner Commission
- Ray Kroc, founder of McDonald's; did not graduate, instead enlisting as an ambulance driver in World War I
- Heather Mack, is an American heiress and criminal
- Prentice H. Marshall, a federal judge who sat on the United States District Court for the Northern District of Illinois (1973—1996)
- Phil C. Neal, dean of the University of Chicago Law School 1963– 1975
- Phil Radford, environmental, clean energy and democracy leader; executive director of Greenpeace
- Roberta L. Raymond, founded the Oak Park Regional Housing Center in 1972, named one of the top housing programs in the United States by the Department of Housing and Urban Development
- Louis Sauer, architect, urban designer, and academic; won numerous awards for developments in modern medium density low rise row housing, particularly in Philadelphia
- Mark Siljander, member of the United States House of Representatives from Michigan
- Carlos Alberto Torres, Puerto Rican nationalist convicted of attempting to overthrow the United States government as a member of the FALN; was on the FBI Most Wanted List; currently serving a 78-year prison sentence
- Marjorie Vincent, Miss America, 1991

== Notable staff ==
- Glenn Thistlethwaite, football and track and field coach at the school (1913–1922) before becoming the head football coach at Northwestern University (1922–1926) and the University of Wisconsin (1927–1931), among others
- John W. Wood, school's soccer coach; in 1952, was appointed head coach of the U.S. men's Olympic soccer team
- Robert Zuppke, football and track and field coach at the school (1910–1913) prior to becoming the head football coach at the University of Illinois (1913–1941); member of the College Football Hall of Fame; some sources cite his innovations (like the flea flicker and screen pass) as having started when he coached here
