= Fairfield Stags men's basketball =

Men's basketball team of Fairfield University

Fairfield Stags
2025–26 Fairfield Stags men's basketball team
- University: Fairfield University
- Head coach: Chris Casey (3rd season)
- Location: Fairfield, Connecticut
- Arena: Leo D. Mahoney Arena (capacity: 3,500)
- Conference: MAAC (CAA beginning 2027)
- Nickname: Stags
- Colors: Red

NCAA Division I tournament Sweet Sixteen
- 1960*, 1962*

NCAA Division I tournament appearances
- 1960*, 1961*, 1962*, 1986, 1987, 1997

Conference tournament champions
- 1986, 1987, 1997

Conference regular-season champions
- 1986, 2011; Tri-State: 1960*, 1961*, 1962*

Uniforms
Home	Away
- * at Division II level

The Fairfield Stags men's basketball team represents Fairfield University in Fairfield, Connecticut and competes in the Metro Atlantic Athletic Conference of NCAA Division I. The Stags play their home games in the 3,500 seat Leo D. Mahoney Arena on campus. The team is currently coached by Chris Casey, his second year at the helm.

The Stags have experienced post-season tournament action fifteen times having competed in the NAIB Tournament in 1951 the NCAA DII Tournament in 1960, 1961 and 1962; the National Invitational Tournament in 1973, 1974, 1978, 1996, 2003; and 2011 NIT; and the NCAA Division I men's basketball tournament in 1986, 1987 and 1997. In the 1973 National Invitation Tournament, the Stags advanced to the second round where the team lost by one point to eventual champion Virginia Tech. And in the 1997 NCAA tournament, the Stags nearly achieved a historical upset of top-seeded North Carolina after leading the Tar Heels by seven points at halftime. The team also won the MAAC Regular Season Title in 1986 and the MAAC Championship Tournament in 1986, 1987 and 1997.

Individually, Joe DeSantis earned All-American honors in 1979; Darren Phillip was the nation's top rebounder averaging 14 rebounds per game in 2000; and Deng Gai was the nation's top shot blocker in 2005 averaging 5.5 blocks per game which ranks #5 on the NCAA's all-time blocked shot average list. Thirteen Stags have been either drafted or signed to play in the National Basketball Association.

== History ==
=== Dawn of the Stags ===
Through the efforts of Rev. Victor Leeber, S.J., Fairfield University introduced men's basketball in 1948 and has played continuously since then. Fairfield played its first-ever game against Brooklyn College in Brooklyn, New York, losing 78–46, and won its first-ever game that season against Hillyer College (now the University of Hartford), 47–37, in Bridgeport, Connecticut, at the Bridgeport Armory, Fairfield's original home court. During the 1950–51 season, under new Head Coach James Hanrahan, the program experienced its first winning season with a 16–11 record and received the school's first postseason berth in the 1951 NAIA National Men's Basketball Championship Tournament.

=== Red Stags rising ===
During the 1958–59 season Head Coach George Bisacca took over the program and proceeded to elevate the Stags to a higher level of success, experiencing only one losing season in 10 years. The Stags received three straight postseason berths to the NCAA Men's Division II Basketball Championship Tournament between 1960 and 1962 and advanced to the second round in 1960 and 1961. On the heels of this postseason success, Fairfield upgraded the program to NCAA Division I beginning with the 1964–65 season. The 1965–66 team went 19–5 and became the first Fairfield team to be ranked in one of the national polls.

=== The Golden Barakat era ===
The most successful stretch of Fairfield basketball occurred under Head Coach Fred Barakat when the Stags received three berths in the post-season NIT in six years which was chronicled in the book, 25 Years Plus One: Recounting the Meteoric Rise of Fairfield Basketball, by Connecticut sportswriter, Don Harrison. During the 1972–73 season the Stags finished with an 18–9 overall record and were invited to the post-season NIT for the first time in the programs history. In the 1st round, Captain George Groom led the Stags to an 80–76 victory over Marshall University playing before 13,904 fans at Madison Square Garden. In the 2nd round, the Stags fell 76–77 to the eventual National Champion Virginia Tech Gobblers before more than 17,000 fans. The Stags followed up this success with a 17–9 overall record and a second invitation to the post-season NIT during the 1973–74 season. In the 1st round, Captain Richie O'Connor led the Stags to a 37–32 halftime lead before falling 65–66 to the University of Hawaii before 17,739 fans. The Stags returned to the post-season NIT for the third time during the 1977–78 season following the program's first 20 win season (22–5 overall) and a record point setting 123–108 victory over the then 14th ranked Holy Cross Crusaders. In the 1st round of the tournament, Junior Mark Young led the Stags with a 32 performance in a 93–108 losing effort to the Dayton Flyers.

=== Back to backs in the MAAC ===
Fairfield earned its first berth in NCAA Men's Division I Basketball Championship in 1986 after sweeping through the St. Peter's Peacocks, Iona Gaels and Holy Cross Crusaders en route to winning the MAAC Championship. The Stags faced the Illinois Fighting Illini in the first round of Southeast Regional of the 1986 NCAA Tournament. The Stags featured five 1,000 point career scorers on this team including Tony George (program's all-time leading scorer with 2006 points), Troy Bradford (1648 points), Jeff Gromos (1429 points), A. J. Wynder (1313 points, drafted by the Boston Celtics in 1987), and Pat Yerina (1255 points). The Stags were coached by first year head coach Mitch Buonoguoro and ended the year with a 24–7 record, the most wins in school history.

The following season, Fairfield overcame an injury-plagued season to mount an improbable run to its second consecutive MAAC Championship and to earn its second consecutive bid to the 1987 NCAA Tournament. The Stags defeated the LaSalle Explorers, Army Black Knights and needed the heroics of a last second shot by A. J. Wynder to help propel the Stags past the Iona Gaels in overtime and to the MAAC Championship. The Stags faced the top-seeded and eventual national champion Indiana Hoosiers in the first round of the Midwest Regional before 29,610 fans in the Hoosier Dome. Jeff Gromos led all Fairfield scorers with 21 points, followed by A. J. Wynder with 15 points.

During the 1995–96 season Head Coach Paul Cormier led the Stags to a 20–10 overall record, an appearance in the MAAC championship game and the program's fourth berth in the NIT. In the opening round of the NIT, the Stags played the Providence College Friars before 6,368 fans at the New Haven Coliseum. Led by Shannon Bowman the Stags held a 46–43 half time lead before eventually falling 78–69 to the Friars.

Picked to win the Metro Atlantic Athletic Conference in 1996–97, Fairfield suffered through an injury-plagued regular season and finished in last place. But the Stags made a Cinderella run in the MAAC tournament, defeating top seed Iona, St. Peter's and Canisius to capture the league's automatic berth in the 1997 NCAA Tournament despite an 11–18 record. Fairfield then gave top seeded North Carolina all it could handle in the first round of the East Region in Winston-Salem, North Carolina. The Stags opened a 37–28 lead early in the second half before their bid to become the first 16 seed to win an NCAA tournament game fell 82–74. Stag legend Greg Francis '97 almost single-handedly upset the Tar Heels scoring 26 points including eight three-pointers. Following the game, legendary North Carolina coach Dean Smith said "I had to find Francis after the game but I couldn't shake his hand because it was so hot."

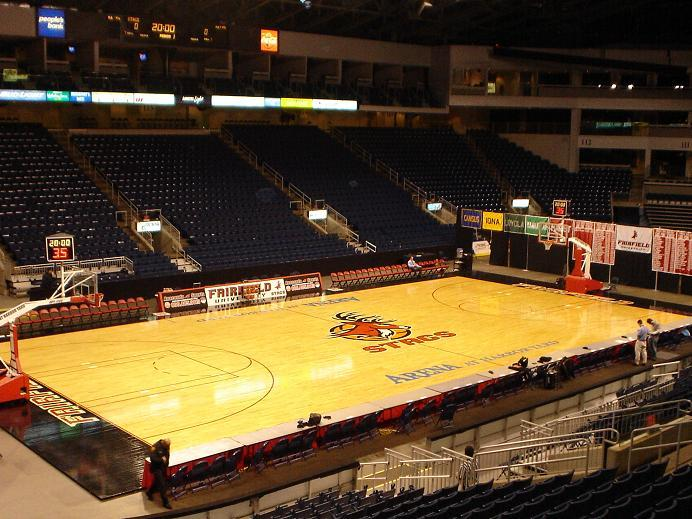
Interior of Total Mortgage Arena

=== O'Toole time ===
In 2002, Stags basketball moved from the on-campus Alumni Hall to the new 9,500 seat Webster Bank Arena in Bridgeport, Connecticut. During that same season, Head Coach Tim O'Toole '87 led the Stags to a 19–12 overall record, an appearance to the MAAC tournament championship game, and the program's fifth berth in the NIT. In the opening round of the NIT, Nick Delfico led the Stags with 14 points in a 90–78 losing effort to the Boston College Eagles before 6,500 fans at the arena. During 2004–05 season, Deng Gai '05 led the nation in shots blocked with 5.5 blocks per game and graduated as number eight on the NCAA's all-time blocked shots list.

=== Cooley and the Gang ===
On April 11, 2006, Ed Cooley (former Boston College Eagles assistant coach) became the program's eleventh Head Coach ushering in a new era of Stags basketball. During the first round of the 2010 CollegeInsider.com Postseason Tournament (CIT) the Stags overcame a 27-point deficit with 16:08 left to play to defeat George Mason in overtime, 101–96. The 27-point comeback is the biggest in Division I postseason history. The Stags were led by senior Mike Evanovich who finished with a career-high 32 points and a school record nine three-pointers including one with 0.9 seconds in regulation to send the game into overtime. Fellow senior Anthony Johnson led the Stags in overtime scoring 9 points and finished with 25 points in the game. And at the conclusion of the 2010 season, Coach Cooley received the inaugural 2010 Ben Jobe National Coach of the Year Award, presented annually to the top minority men's basketball coach in the nation, in recognition of his coaching the Stags through numerous injuries to a near school record 23-win season and Derek Needham was named a Freshman All-American. During the 2010–11 season, Fairfield won the MAAC regular season title and earned a berth in the 2011 NIT where the Stags beat the Colorado State Rams, 62–60, in the first round. Additionally, Coach Ed Cooley and sophomore Derek Needham earned recognition from the United States Basketball Writers Association (USBWA) with Cooley named the District I Coach of the Year and Needham selected to the District I-New England team.

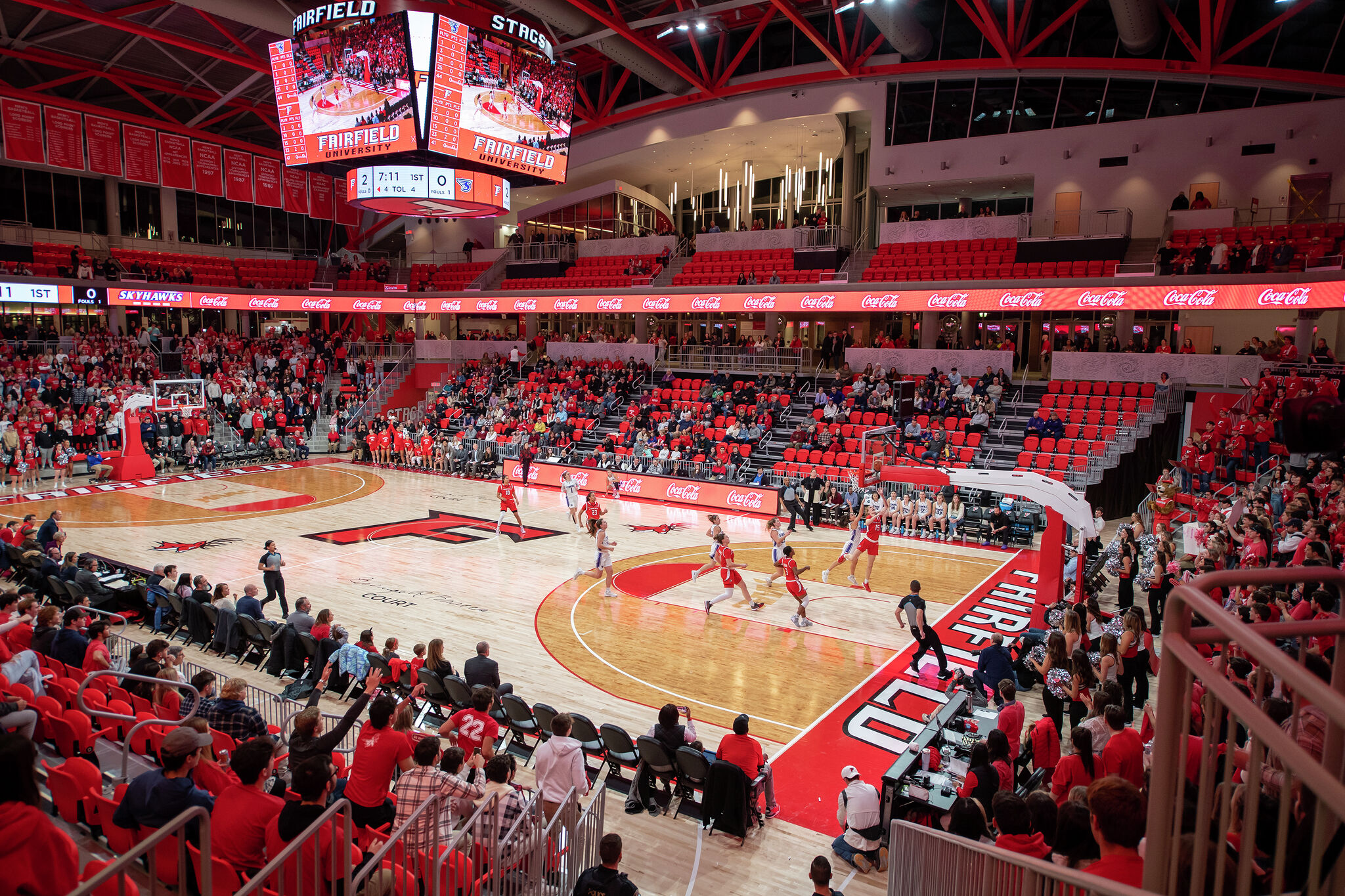
Leo D. Mahoney Arena

=== Johnson era ===
In April 2011, Johnson accepted a head coaching position at Fairfield University, replacing Ed Cooley. He coached the 2011–12 Stags to the semifinals of the 2012 CollegeInsider.com Postseason Tournament where they lost to Mercer, after defeating Yale, Manhattan and Robert Morris to finish with a 22–15 record. Mercer went on to win the tournament. For the second season in a row, he was a finalist for the Ben Jobe Award. The 2012–13 team started the season 10–10 (2–6) before winning five consecutive and seven out of eight Metro Atlantic Athletic Conference games. The team then lost its two final conference games to finish 9–9 in conference. Eventually the team finished 19–15 (9–9).

=== Jay Young experiment ===
On April 3, 2019 Young was named the 13th head coach in Fairfield history. Jay was a long time Steve Pikell assistant at Stony Brook and Rutgers. Jay's tenure is highlighted by wins over Texas A&M, Towson and a run to the MAAC Championship game in 2020-21. Fairfield never finished above 7th place with Jay at the helm. On October 16, 2023, Young stepped down as head coach, ending his four-year tenure as head coach. He finished with a 50−73 record and zero NCAA tournament or alternate post season appearances.

=== Casey's Crew ===
Chris Casey took over the interim head coaching position after former head coach Jay Young stepped down as head coach on October 16, 2023. As the interim head coach Casey took Fairfield to their first 20+ win regular season since 2010-11. Prior to the MAAC Championship Chris Casey was named head coach on March 12, 2024. They finished the year 22-12 (14-6) and made it to the MAAC Championship Game before losing to St. Peters. Fairfield accepted a bid to the 2024 College Basketball Invitational (CBI), which is their first postseason game since 2017.

== All-time head coaches ==
Years	Coach	Record	Postseason
1948–1949	Joe Dunn	9–14	-
1949–1950	Bob Noonan	5–16	-
1950–1958	James Hanrahan	82–79	1951 NAIB
1958–1968	George Bisacca	151–85	1960 NCAA, 1961 NCAA, 1962 NCAA
1968–1970	Jim Lynam	23–29	-
1970–1981	Fred Barakat	160–128	1973 NIT, 1974 NIT, 1978 NIT
1981–1985	Terry O'Conner	45–68	-
1985–1991	Mitch Buonaguro	72–103	1986 NCAA, 1987 NCAA
1991–1998	Paul Cormier	86–111	1996 NIT, 1997 NCAA
1998–2006	Tim O'Toole	112–120	2003 NIT
2006–2011	Ed Cooley	92–69	2010 CIT, 2011 NIT
2011–2019	Sydney Johnson	116–147	2012 CIT, 2013 CIT, 2016 CIT, 2017 CIT
2020–2023	Jay Young	50–73	-
2023–present	Chris Casey	24–13	2024 CBI
71 years	Total	1027–1055	–

== Postseason ==
=== NCAA Division I Tournament results ===
The Stags have appeared in the NCAA Division I Tournament three times. Their combined record is 0–3.

Year	Seed	Round	Opponent	Result
1986	#13	First round	#4 Illinois	L 51–75
1987	#16	First round	#1 Indiana	L 58–92
1997	#16	First round	#1 North Carolina	L 74–82

=== NCAA Division II Tournament results ===
The Stags have appeared in the NCAA Division II Tournament three times. Their combined record is 2–4.

Year	Round	Opponent	Result
1960	Regional semifinals Regional Finals	Drexel; American	W 56–44; L 74–75
1961	Regional semifinals Regional 3rd-place game	Albright; Virginia Union	L 67–85; L 66–70
1962	Regional semifinals Regional Finals	Rochester; Northeastern	W 86–75; L 69–80

=== NAIB Tournament results ===
The Stags have appeared in the NAIB Basketball Tournament one time. Their record is 2–1.

Year	Round	Opponent	Result
1951	Opening Round; Second Round; Consolation Game	Tufts University; St. Anselm's; St. Anselm's	L 58–55; W 68–64; W 68–63

=== NIT results ===
The Stags have appeared in the National Invitation Tournament (NIT) six times. Their combined record is 2–6.

Year	Round	Opponent	Result
1973	First round Quarterfinals	Marshall; Virginia Tech	W 80–76; L 76–77
1974	First round	Hawaiʻi	L 65–66
1978	First round	Dayton	L 93–108
1996	First round	Providence	L 79–91
2003	Opening Round	Boston College	L 78–90
2011	First round Second Round	Colorado State; Kent State	W 62–60; L 68–72

=== CIT results ===
The Stags have appeared in the CollegeInsider.com Postseason Tournament (CIT) five times. Their combined record is 4–5.

Year	Round	Opponent	Result
2010	First round Quarterfinals	George Mason; Creighton	W 101–96^{OT} L 55–73
2012	First round Second Round; Quarterfinals; Semifinals	Yale; Manhattan; Robert Morris; Mercer	W 68–56; W 69–57; W 67–61; L 59–64
2013	First round	Kent State	L 71–73
2016	First round	New Hampshire	L 62–77
2017	First round	UMBC	L 83–88

=== CBI results ===
The Stags have appeared in the College Basketball Invitational (CBI) one time. Their combined record is 2–1.

Year	Round	Opponent	Result
2024	First round Quarterfinals; Semifinals	Little Rock; Chicago State; Seattle	W 82–72; W 77–74; L 58–75

== Awards ==
=== All-American ===
- Joe DeSantis (1979)
- Troy Bradford (Pre-Season, 1988)
- Derek Needham (Freshman, 2010)

=== National Coach of the Year ===
- Ed Cooley (Ben Jobe Award, 2010)

=== All-East ===
- Robert Jenkins Sr. (1962)
- Nick Macarchuk (1962, 1963)
- Bill Jones (1968)
- Joe DeSantis (1979)
- Mark Young (1979)

=== All-New England ===
- Bill Jones (1968)
- Joe DeSantis (1978, 1979)
- Mark Young (1979)
- Tony George (1986)
- Derek Needham (2011)

=== All-Metropolitan ===
- Peter J. DeBisschop (1983)
- Tony George (1984, 1985, 1986)
- Troy Bradford (1988)
- Drew Henderson (1992,1993)
- Shannon Bowman (1997)
- Darren Phillip (2nd, 2000)
- Jermaine Clark (4th, 2000)
- Jon Han (3rd, 2008)
- Anthony Johnson (2nd, 2010)
- Derek Needham (3rd, 2010)
- Marcus Gilbert (2016)
- Tyler Nelson (MAAC, 2018)

=== League Coach of the Year ===
- Ed Cooley (MAAC, 2011)
- Tim O'Toole (MAAC, 2004)
- Paul Cormier (MAAC, 1996)
- Mitch Buonaguro (MAAC, 1986)

=== League Player of the Year ===
- Tony George (MAAC, 1986)
- Tyquawn Goode (Defensive, MAAC, 2004)
- Deng Gai (Defensive, MAAC, 2002, 2003, 2005)
- Anthony Johnson (Defensive, MAAC, 2010)
- Derek Needham (Rookie, MAAC, 2010)
- Mike Evanovich (Sixth Man, MAAC, 2010)

=== First Team All-League ===
- Hank Foster (MAAC, 1982)
- Pete DeBisschop (MAAC, 1982, 1983)
- Tony George (MAAC, 1986)
- Jeff Gromos (MAAC, 1987)
- Troy Bradford (MAAC, 1988)
- Drew Henderson (MAAC, 1992,1993)
- Darren Phillip (MAAC, 1999, 2000)
- Sam Spann (MAAC, 2001)
- Rob Thomson (MAAC, 2004)
- Deng Gai (MAAC, 2003, 2005)
- Anthony Johnson (MAAC, 2010)
- Derek Needham (MAAC, 2011)
- Marcus Gilbert (MAAC, 2016)
- Tyler Nelson (MAAC, 2018)
- Jalen Leach (MAAC, 2024)

== All-time statistic leaders ==
=== Career leaders ===
- Points scored: Tyler Nelson (2,032, 2014–2018)
- Scoring Average: George Groom (19.8, 1970–73)
- Field Goals Made: Tony George (748, 1982–86)
- Field goal percentage: Hank Foster (.582, 1978–82)
- Assists: John Ryan (675, 1971–74)
- Rebounds: Drew Henderson (1080, 1989–93)
- Blocks: Deng Gai (444, 2002–05)
- Free throws made: Mark Young (543, 1975–79)
- Free throw percentage: Joe DeSantis (.849, 1975–79)
- 3pt Field Goals Made: Tyler Nelson (293, 2014–18)
- 3pt Field goal percentage: Mike Evanovich (.402, 2008–10)

=== Single-game leaders ===
- Points scored: Curtis Cobb (46, 2017)
- Assists: John Ryan (23, 1973)
- Rebounds: Art Crawford (28, 1960)
- Blocks: Deng Gai (13, 2005)
- Free throws made: Troy Bradford (21, 1988)
- 3pt Field Goals Made: Mike Evanovich (9, 2010)

=== Single-season leaders ===
- Points scored: Tyler Nelson (732, 2018)
- Scoring Average: Troy Bradford (22.7, 1988)
- Field Goals Made: Tony George (226, 1986)
- Field goal percentage: Mark Young (.629, 1978)
- Assists: John Ryan (301, 1974)
- Rebounds: Darren Phillip (405, 2000)
- Blocks: Deng Gai (165, 2005)
- Free throws made: Mark Young (193, 1979)
- Free throw percentage: Joe DeSantis (.892, 1977)
- 3pt Field Goals Made: Caleb Fields (113, 2024)
- 3pt Field goal percentage: Mike Evanovich (.471, 2010)
- Total Steals in a Season: Jasper Floyd (87, 2024)

== Stags in the pros ==
The following Stags play or played professional basketball across the globe:

Player	Class	Top League	Top Team
Tyler Nelson	2018	NBA G League	Greensboro Swarm
Amadou Sidibé	2017	HLA Lucentum	LEB Plata
Marcus Gilbert	2016	FC Porto	Liga Portuguesa de Basquetebol
Maurice Barrow	2014	Austrian Basketball League	Klosterneuburg Dukes
Derek Needham	2013	Lega Basket Serie A	Pallacanestro Reggiana
Sean Crawford	2012	Turkish Basketball First League	Pertevniyal S.K.
Rakim Sanders	2012	Lega Basket Serie A	Pallacanestro Olimpia Milano
Ryan Olander	2012	Lithuanian Basketball League	BC Šiauliai
Jonathan Han	2011	Polish Basketball League	Śląsk Wrocław
Terrence Todd	2006	Premier League	UCC Demons
Deng Gai	2005	National Basketball Association	Philadelphia 76ers
Rob Thomson	2004	Liga Națională	CS Gaz Metan Mediaș
Ajou Deng	2003	British Basketball League	PAWS London Capitals
Darren Phillip	2000	Liga ACB	Unicaja Málaga
Drew Henderson	1993	National Basketball Association	Boston Celtics
Troy Bradford	1990	Spanish Basketball League	Upct Basket Cartagena
A. J. Wynder	1987	National Basketball Association	Boston Celtics
Joe DeSantis	1979	Lega Basket Serie A	Reyer Venezia Mestre
Art Kenny	1968	Lega Basket Serie A	Olimpia Milano

== Stags in the NBA draft ==
The following Stag players were selected in the National Basketball Association draft:

Player	Year	Round	Team
Larry Rafferty	1965	16th	Philadelphia 76ers
Bill Jones	1968	7th	Philadelphia 76ers
Art Kenny	1968	18th	Baltimore Bullets
Rich O'Connor	1974	8th	Kansas City-Omaha
Phil Rogers	1974	10th	Buffalo Braves
Danny Odums	1976	6th	Buffalo Braves
Steve Balkun	1978	7th	Boston Celtics
Kim Fisher	1978	8th	Boston Celtics
Joe DeSantis	1979	2nd	Washington Bullets
Mark Young	1979	2nd	Los Angeles Lakers
Pete DeBisschop	1983	4th	Seattle SuperSonics

== Stags in coaching ==
The following Stags coached or are coaching basketball at the collegiate level:

Name	Class	Position	Team
Joe DeSantis	1979	Head coach	Quinnipiac Bobcats
Greg Francis	1997	Head coach	Alberta Golden Bears
Pete Gillen	1968	Head coach	Xavier Musketeers
James Hanrahan	1952	Head coach	Fairfield Stags
Nick Macarchuk	1963	Head coach	Fordham Rams
Luke Murray	2007	Assistant coach	Uconn Huskies
Tim O'Toole	1987	Assistant coach	California Golden Bears
Brendan Suhr	1979	Associate head coach	LSU Tiger
Keith Urgo	2002	Head coach	Fordham
A. J. Wynder	1987	Head coach	Nassau Community College
Ryan Olander	2012	Assistant coach	Central Connecticut State University
Sean Crawford	2012	Director of Player Personnel	Seton Hall University
Taj Benning	2021	Assistant coach	Fairfield Stags

== WVOF radio broadcasts ==
WVOF is the home of Fairfield Stags men's basketball. Men's basketball coverage is led play-by-play analyst Bob Heussler with color commentary from Stag basketball legend Joe DeSantis '79.
