= Horace Mann Elementary School =

Horace Mann Elementary School, schools named after Horace Mann, may refer to:

- Horace Mann Elementary School (Bakersfield, California)
- Horace Mann Elementary School (Cherry Hill, New Jersey)
- Horace Mann Elementary School (Newton, Massachusetts)
- Horace Mann Elementary School (Oak Park, Illinois)
- Horace Mann Elementary School (San Jose, California)
- Horace Mann Elementary School (Tacoma, Washington)
- Horace Mann Elementary School (Bayonne, New Jersey)
- Horace Mann Elementary School (Washington, DC)
- Horace Mann Elementary School (Wichita, Kansas)
- Horace Mann Elementary School (West Allis, Wisconsin)
- Horace Mann Elementary School (Iowa City, Iowa)
