= Crosby High School (Connecticut) =

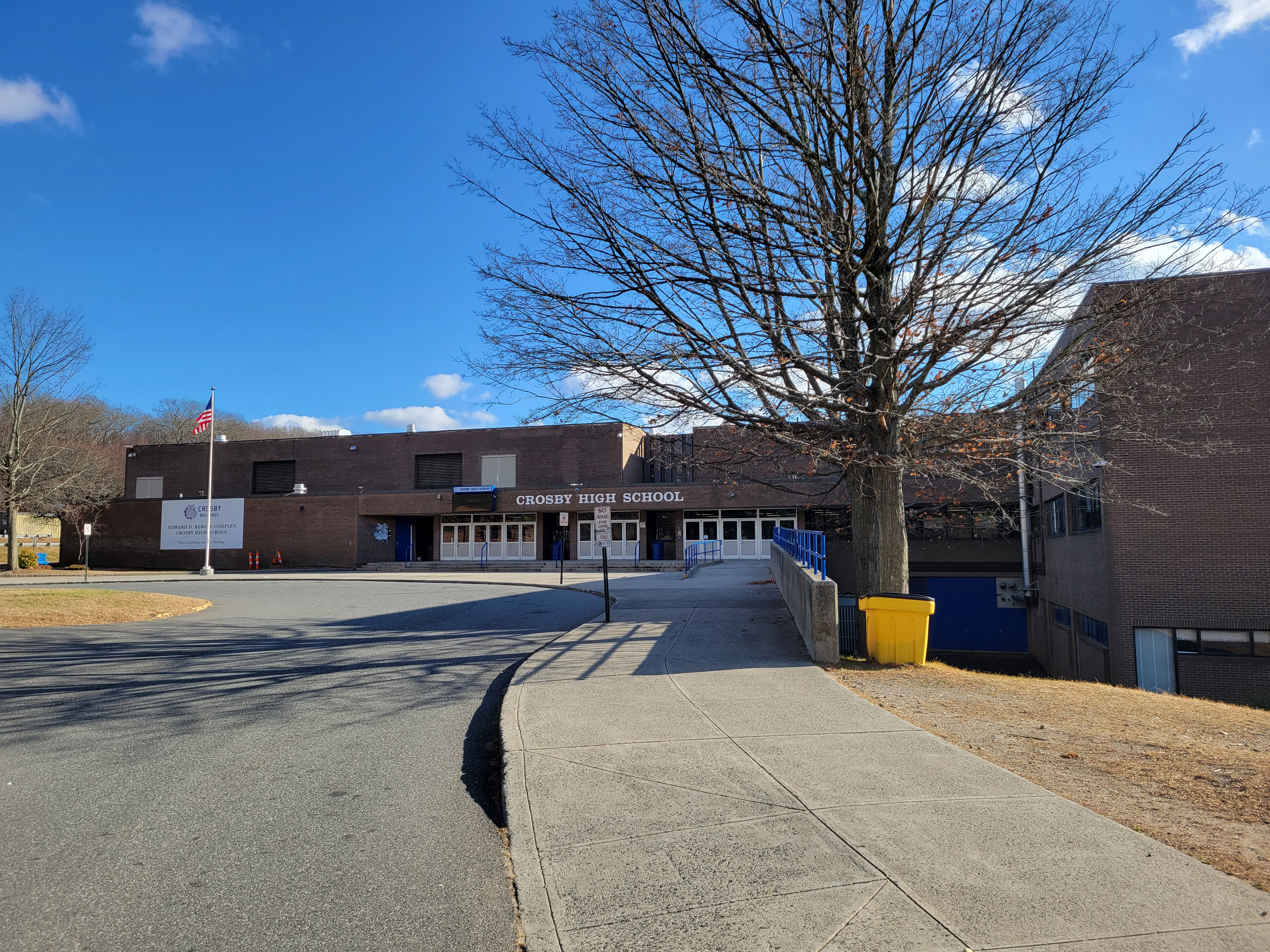
- Crosby High School

Location
- 300 Pierpont Road; Waterbury, Connecticut 06705; United States; 41°32′52″N 72°58′27″W

Information
- Type: Comprehensive Public High School
- Motto: Quam Esse Videri and Home of the Bulldogs
- Established: 1851 (175 years ago)
- School district: Waterbury Public Schools
- Superintendent: Darren Schwartz
- CEEB code: 070835
- Principal: Michael Veronneau
- Teaching staff: 85.25 (FTE)
- Grades: 9–12
- Enrollment: 1,453 (2024-2025)
- Student to teacher ratio: 17.04
- Colors: Blue and White
- Mascot: Bulldog
- Newspaper: Argus
- Website: crosby.waterbury.k12.ct.us

Crosby High School is a public high school located in the East End section of the city of Waterbury, Connecticut. It is part of the Waterbury Public Schools district. It was first opened in 1851 and is currently the third oldest high school in Connecticut. It has an enrollment of approximately 1,453 students. Originally located at 255 East Main Street in Waterbury, it moved to 300 Pierpont Road in September, 1974. It is attached to Wallace Middle School, in the Edward D. Bergin Educational Park. The former principal was Jade L. Gopie. As of 2026, Michael Veronneau, has served as the school's head principal since 2021.

== History ==
When first opened 164 years ago it was called Waterbury High. A fire destroyed Waterbury High building after which a second one opened in 1873 on Elm Street. Crosby High School is named after former Waterbury Superintendent, Minot Sherman Crosby.

== Sports ==
Wins in CIAC State Championships
Sport	Class	Year(s)
Basketball (boys)	L	1998
Basketball (boys)	I	2005
Basketball (boys)	LL	2008
Swimming (boys)	M	1975

== Notable alumni ==
- John S. Monagan, class of 1929, Mayor of Waterbury 1943–48, U.S. Representative 5th District 1959-73
- Caswell Silver, class of 1934, geologist, CEO of Sundance Oil Co.
- Leon Silver, class of 1942, geologist who trained Apollo astronauts in field geology for lunar exploration
- Lisa Nemec, first Croatian long-distance runner to be qualified for the Olympics
- Rick Mastracchio, class of 1978, NASA astronaut
- Jerome Cunningham, #86 Tight end for New York Giants
- Patrick Graham, class of 1997, NFL coach
- Louis Sobol, Broadway columnists
- James Hanrahan, school founder and college basketball coach
- Anthony Ireland, class of 2009, founder of the AI3 Basketball Leadership Academy.
- Geraldo Reyes Jr., class of 1976, State Representative of Connecticut's 75th State House District
