= Tim O'Toole (basketball) =

American basketball player and coach (born 1964)

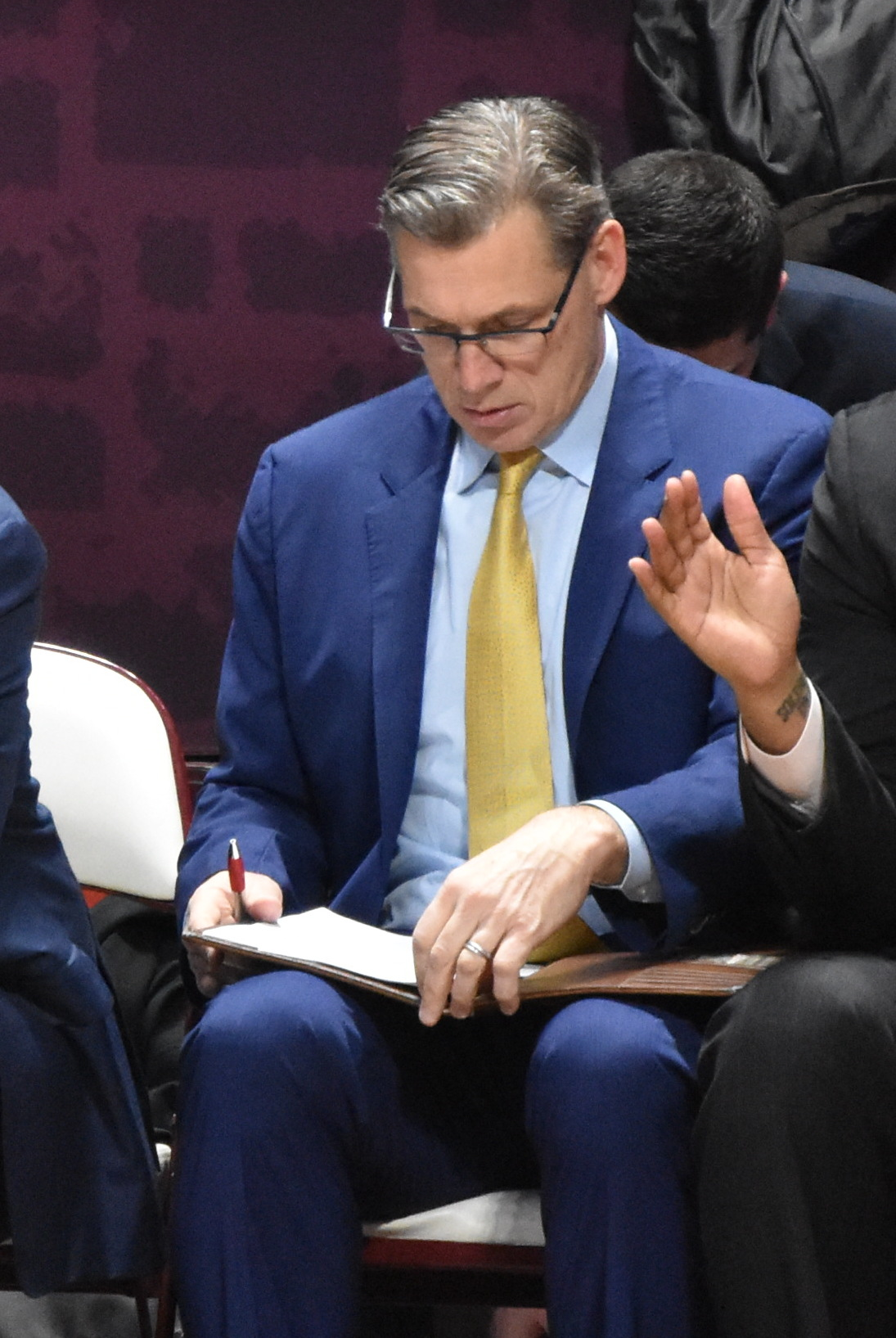

Current position
- Title: Chief of Staff
- Team: Boston College
- Conference: ACC

Biographical details
- Born: March 5, 1964 (age 62); White Plains, New York, U.S.

Playing career
- 1984–1987: Fairfield

Coaching career (HC unless noted)
- 1988–1989: Fordham (assistant)
- 1989–1990: Army (assistant)
- 1990–1991: Iona (assistant)
- 1992–1995: Syracuse (assistant)
- 1995–1997: Duke (assistant)
- 1997–1998: Seton Hall (assistant)
- 1998–2006: Fairfield
- 2013–2016: Stanford (assistant)
- 2016–2018: California (assoc. HC)
- 2018–2026: Pittsburgh (assoc. HC)

Administrative career (AD unless noted)
- 2013: Syracuse (DBO)
- 2026-present: Boston College (Chief of Staff)

Accomplishments and honors

Awards
- MAAC Coach of the Year (2004)

Tim O'Toole (born March 5, 1964) is an American college basketball coach, most recently the associate head coach at Pittsburgh. He was previously the tenth head coach of the Fairfield Stags men's basketball team. He also worked in the media as an ESPN college basketball analyst and was the color analyst for St. John's University's radio broadcasts with John Minko.

== Coaching career ==
O'Toole was the head coach of the Fairfield Stags men's basketball team from 1998 to 2006 where he compiled a 112–120 record. He was named the Metro Atlantic Athletic Conference (MAAC) Coach of the Year in 2004. O'Toole's best season came in 2002-03, when the Stags won 19 games and, after losing the MAAC championship game to the Manhattan Jaspers, earned a berth in the NIT. While at Fairfield, he was also recognized by the state of Connecticut for implementing a reading program designed to promote the importance of academics and athletics that reached more than 65,000 kids.

O'Toole had also been an assistant coach for the Fordham Rams (1988–89), Army Black Knights (1989–90), Iona Gaels (1990–91), Syracuse Orange (1992–95), Duke Blue Devils (1995–97), and Seton Hall Pirates (1997–98). He is the only coach to serve as an assistant under Mike Krzyzewski and Jim Boeheim, the two winningest coaches in NCAA Division I history.

On January 2, 2013, O'Toole was named director of basketball operations for Syracuse University, returning to the school where he served as an assistant coach under head coach Jim Boeheim from 1992-1995. Syracuse went to the 2013 Final Four that season. The next season, he went out west to Stanford where he served as an assistant to Johnny Dawkins from 2013–2016. With the Cardinal, he went to the Sweet Sixteen in the 2014 NCAA Division I men's basketball tournament and won the 2015 NIT. In 2016, he took a job under Cuonzo Martin with the Golden Bears of Cal Berkeley. In 2017, he was promoted to associate head coach.

In 2018, O’Toole returned to the east coast to work with Jeff Capel at the University of Pittsburgh. He was fired in March 2026.

== Playing career ==
O'Toole played at the collegiate level for Fairfield University. He gained the title as the only fourth player in school history to be named captain twice (1985–86, 1986–87). He was a member of the Fairfield teams that won two straight MAAC titles and reached the NCAA tournament in 1986 and 1987. He was named co-MVP following his junior season after averaging 11.6 points per game. O'Toole earned the Patrick Burke award in 1983 and 1984, a recognition given by the university to the player who showed the most hustle and determination. He also received the Jerry Lademan award, presented to a Stag for academic success. And he also earned the Fairfield University Male Athlete of the Year as a senior. In 2017, O'Toole was inducted into the Fairfield University Hall of Fame.

At Archbishop Stepinac High School, he averaged 21 points and seven rebounds per game under Gene Doris, formerly the director of athletics at Fairfield University. He was an All-Archdiocese pick and New York Post second team All-CHSAA pick.

== Education ==
O’Toole received his B.A. from Fairfield University in economics/political science and his M.B.A. in finance from Fordham University.
