= Gabe Levin =

American-Israeli basketball player

Gabe Levin גייב לוין
No. 19 – Stockton Kings
- Position: Forward
- League: NBA G League

Personal information
- Born: August 2, 1994 (age 32) Chicago, Illinois, U.S.
- Listed height: 6 ft 8 in (2.03 m)
- Listed weight: 235 lb (107 kg)

Career information
- High school: Oak Park and River Forest (Oak Park, Illinois); St. Thomas More (Oakdale, Connecticut)
- College: Loyola Marymount (2013–2014); Long Beach State (2015–2018)
- NBA draft: 2018: undrafted
- Playing career: 2018–present

Career history
- 2018–2021: Bnei Herzliya
- 2022–2023: South Bay Lakers
- 2024–present: Stockton Kings
- 2026: Calgary Surge

Career highlights
- NBA G League champion (2025); First-team All-Big West (2018); WCC All-Freshman Team (2014)
- Stats at NBA.com
- Stats at Basketball Reference

Gabriel Louis Levin (born August 2, 1994) is an American-Israeli professional basketball player for the Stockton Kings of the NBA G League. He played college basketball for the Loyola Marymount Lions and the Long Beach State Beach.

== Early and personal life ==
Levin was born in Chicago, Illinois, grew up in Oak Park, Illinois, and is Jewish. His parents are Mary Jo and Hillel Levin, and he has two brothers and two sisters. His brother Aaron played basketball at Grinnell College, and is now an assistant coach for the school's basketball team. He is 6 ft 8 in (203 cm) tall, and weighs 230 pounds (100 kg).

== College career ==
Levin attended Oak Park and River Forest High School, and averaged almost 20 points and 10 rebounds per game as a senior. He was a fourth-team All-State selection of the Illinois Basketball Coaches Association, and was named to the ESPN Chicago All-Area Team.

Levin then attended St. Thomas More School in Oakdale, Connecticut, for a year of post-graduate studies. He was a First-Team All-New England Preparatory School Athletic Council selection.

He attended Loyola Marymount University (Psychology) in 2013–14. Levin played for the Loyola Marymount Lions, averaged 11.1 points and 7.2 rebounds per game, and was fifth in the conference with 1.2 blocks per game. In 2014 he was West Coast Conference All-Freshman Team. He redshirted during the 2014–15 season, attending Marquette University.

Levin then transferred to California State University, Long Beach in 2015, where he played basketball for the Long Beach State Beach from 2015 to 2018. In 2015–16 he averaged 9.5 points and 5.9 rebounds per game, averaged 2.2 offensive rebounds a game (second in the league), shot 50.2% from the field (sixth-best in the Big West Conference), and was seventh with 0.8 blocks per game. In 2016 he was All-Big West Honorable Mention. In 2016–17 he averaged 12.2 points and 6.2 rebounds per game, until a fractured knee injury ended his season, which was followed by successful knee surgery. In 2017–18 he averaged 18.5 points (third in the Big West) and 7.3 rebounds per game, and was third in the Big West in field goal percentage (.455), fourth in rebounds per game (7.2), and sixth in free throw percentage (.815). On February 3, 2018, Levin scored 45 points to match a 47-year-old Long Beach State men's basketball record. On January 15, 2018, he was named Big West Player of the Week, and in 2018 he was Big West First Team.

== Professional career ==
=== Bnei Herzliya (2018–2021) ===
He has played for Bnei Herzliya Basket in the Israeli Basketball Premier League in 2018–19 and 2020–2021.

=== South Bay Lakers (2022–2023) ===
On November 3, 2022, Levin joined the South Bay Lakers, but was waived on December 21. On March 9, 2023, Levin was reacquired by South Bay and on November 13, he was waived.

=== Stockton Kings (2024–present) ===
On February 2, 2024, Levin joined the Stockton Kings.
