= Tyler Nelson (basketball) =

American basketball player

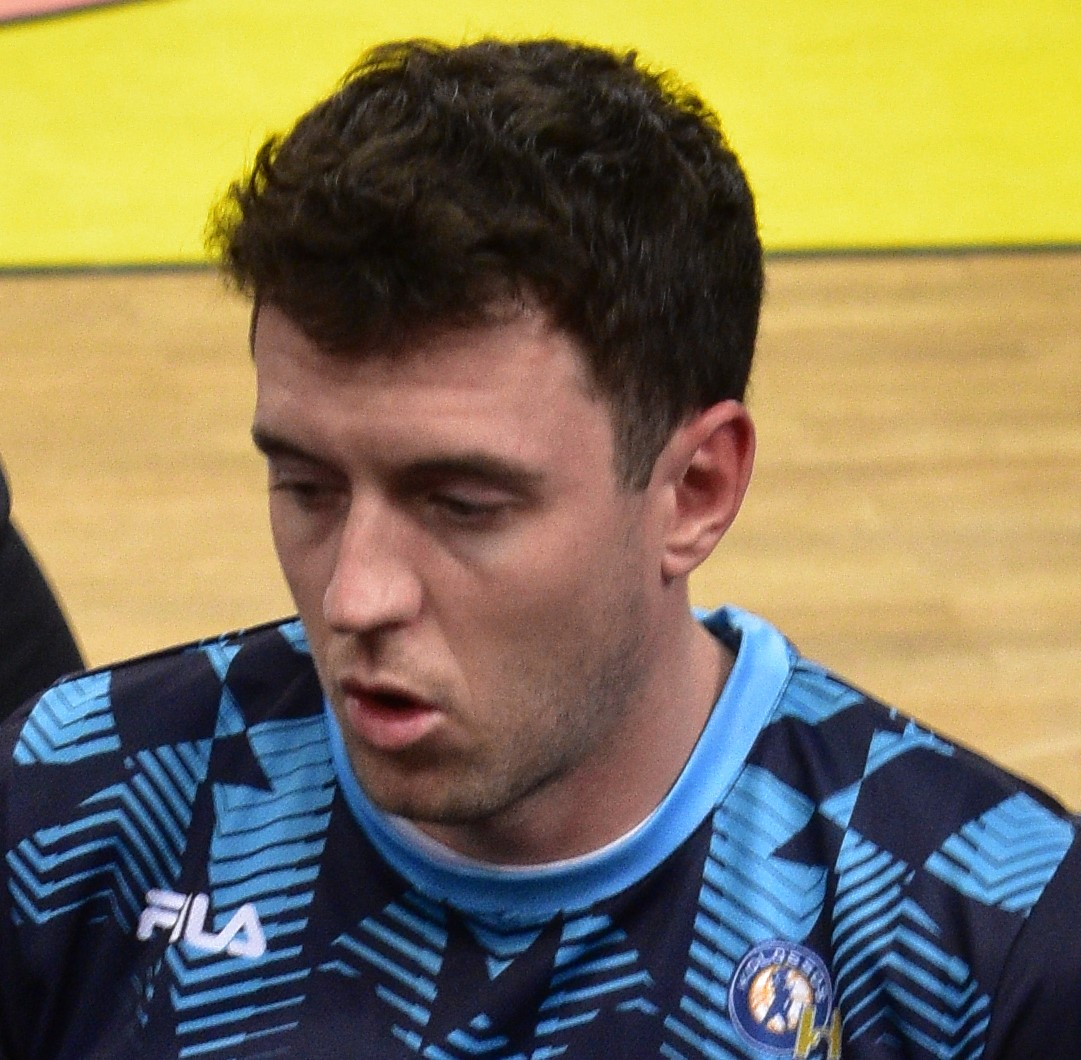
- Nelson with Kolossos Rodou

No. 22 – Free Agent
- Position: Point guard

Personal information
- Born: August 9, 1995 (age 31)
- Listed height: 6 ft 3 in (1.91 m)
- Listed weight: 180 lb (82 kg)

Career information
- High school: Central Catholic (Lawrence, Massachusetts)
- College: Fairfield (2014–2018)
- NBA draft: 2018: undrafted
- Playing career: 2018–2025

Career history
- 2018–2020: Greensboro Swarm
- 2020: Texas Legends
- 2021–2024: Rostock Seawolves
- 2024–2025: Kolossos Rodou
- 2025: Science City Jena

Career highlights
- 2x First-team All-MAAC (2017, 2018)

Tyler Nelson (born August 9, 1995) is a retired American professional basketball player. He played professionally in the United States, Germany and Greece and collegiality for the Fairfield Stags.

== High school career ==
Nelson is the son Anne Marie Nelson, a high school teacher and Jeffrey Nelson, a high school teacher and NBA scout with the Los Angeles Lakers, and brother to Alyssa Nelson, a math teacher. He grew up in Bradford, Massachusetts. He attended Central Catholic High School and starred on the basketball team. He led Catholic to the Massachusetts Division I championship game. He was named Massachusetts's Gatorade Player of the Year. Fairfield assistant Martin Bahar convinced him to join the program.

== College career ==
As a freshman, Nelson averaged 9.7 points per game on a 7–24 team and was named to the All-Metro Atlantic Athletic Conference Freshman Team. He averaged 16.0 points per game as a sophomore as Fairfield's record improved to 19-14 and the Stags took part in the CollegeInsider.com Tournament. Nelson was named to the Second Team All-MAAC as a sophomore. He posted 19.5 points per game as a junior as Fairfield went 16-15 and again appeared in the CollegeInsider.com Tournament.

On February 15, 2018, Nelson scored his 2,000th career point in an 83–79 win over Marist. He had 32 points in a win over Quinnipiac on February 17. As a senior, he averaged 22.2 points, 4.2 rebounds and 3.3 assists per game. He earned First Team All-MAAC honors for the second straight season. He finished his career with 2,172 points, the most in school history.

== Professional career ==
=== Greensboro Swarm (2018–2020) ===
After going undrafted in the 2018 NBA draft, Nelson was signed by the Minnesota Timberwolves in the NBA Summer League and appeared in three games, averaging 1.3 points per game. Nelson was selected with the third overall pick of the 2018 NBA G League draft by the Greensboro Swarm. He subsequently was added to the Swarm's training camp roster.

=== Texas Legends (2020) ===
On February 28, 2020, Nelson was traded to the Texas Legends alongside Josh Perkins in exchange for Quincy Acy and a second-round pick in the 2020 G League draft. On November 23, 2019, Nelson recorded 17 points, one rebound, one assist and one steal in a win over the Windy City Bulls.

=== Rostock Seawolves (2021–2024) ===
On January 22, 2021, Nelson signed with the Rostock Seawolves of the German Basketball Bundesliga.

=== Kolossos Rodou (2024–2025) ===
On September 26, 2024, Nelson moved to Kolossos Rodou. On January 14, 2025, Nelson was released from the Greek club.

=== Science City Jena (2025–present) ===
On January 15, 2025, he signed with Science City Jena of the German ProA. He retired in 2025 and returned to Fairfield University, where he was named Director of NIL Operations and Player Relations.
