= Louis Sobol =

American journalist

Louis Sobol (August 10, 1896 – February 9, 1986) was an American journalist, Broadway gossip columnist, and radio host. Sobol wrote for Hearst newspapers for forty years, and was considered one of the country's most popular columnists. Sobol wrote about celebrities during the years when well-known columnists themselves became celebrities.

== Early life ==
Sobol was born in New Haven, Connecticut. He attended Crosby High School and was the chairman of the Dramatic Club, business manager of the school paper, and manager of the baseball team. While still in high school, Sobol worked as a reporter for the Waterbury Republican.

== Career ==
Sobol continued to work on the Republican after high school, then left the Republican to work for the Bridgeport Standard. He served in the Army during World War I. After the war, Sobol returned to Connecticut where he became acting city editor on the New London Day and was an occasional contributor to Variety. He then moved to New York where he worked for the Famous Features Syndicate, ghost-writing first-person stories which appeared in the New York Evening Graphic and New York Journal on behalf of clients, among them "Daddy" and Peaches Browning and Queen Marie of Romania.

On May 31, 1929, Sobol took over Your Broadway and Mine column from Walter Winchell for the New York Evening Graphic. He added a second column, Snapshots at Random, in October, 1929. Sobol resigned from the Graphic in 1931, taking his column to New York Evening Journal and renaming it The Voice of Broadway. The column was later called New York Cavalcade. Sobol's radio shows included the Borden Show and Ludwig Baumann Show on WOR, the Lucky Strike Hour on WEAF, and daily broadcasts for the American Broadcasting network.

During 1932, Sobol performed in a vaudeville revival at the Palace Theatre In 1933, he hosted a series of short films called "Louis Sobol shorts". In 1938, Sobol was given a luncheon to recognize his work for the New York and Brooklyn Federations of Jewish Charities.

Sobol published two memoirs and a novel. His novel Six Lost Women was recommended by the reviewer in The New York Times for "the sentimental reader". Sobol's book Some Days Were Happy is a memoir of his youth and early career. His memoir The Longest Street, which Maurice Zolotow described as "the longest Broadway column ever written" and "a truthful rendering of a certain way of life at a certain period in New York history", describes the people he met and wrote about, the parties they all attended, and what it was like to go from being a small town journalist to a chronicler of Broadway, New York City, and Hollywood. Sobol wrote one play, The High Hatters, which received disappointing reviews.

Sobol played himself in the 1947 film Copacabana. In 1953, he was called "one of the nation's most popular columnists"; at that time, his New York Cavalcade column had a combined readership between 10 and 14,000,000, being syndicated throughout the country. In 1962, Sobol was honored as "Man of the Year" by the March of Dimes. Columnist Dan Lewis described Sobol as "a monumental influence in the world of show business". Sobol retired from journalism in 1967. Jim Bishop called Sobol "the most beloved" of the Broadway columnists.

== Personal life ==
Sobol married Leah Helen Cantor in 1919. They had one daughter. Leah died at age 51 in 1948. Sobol then married Peggy Strohl, a publicist, at City Hall in Santa Barbara, California on July 29, 1950.

Sobol died at Roosevelt Hospital on February 9, 1986, at age 90.
