= East End (Waterbury) =

Neighborhood of Waterbury, Connecticut, United States

Coordinates: 41.55°N 73.00°W

The East End is a neighborhood in the city of Waterbury, Connecticut. It has a commercial center, schools, parks and community gatherings.

== Infrastructure ==
The East End lies along I-84 and goes from the Downtown District to the Cheshire line. Four west-bound and 3 east-bound exits off of I-84 in the East End access the neighborhood. Residential areas mostly consist of single-family homes, although several condo complexes, apartment buildings, and three-family housing units are there.

== Demographics ==
The East End has historically been home to Waterbury's Irish immigrants. Many Irish restaurants, businesses and families occupy the East End and with Italians make up a large portion of the section's demographics.

The East End hosts roughly 42,260 of Waterbury's 110,000 population. Of that number, 19,885 are male and 22,376 are female. 16,477 households in the East End average a median income of $55,572.

== Education ==
The East End is home to 5 public schools including one of the two magnet schools in the city.

- Crosby High School
- Wallace Middle School
- M.M Generali Elementary School
- Rotella Magnet School
- Chase Elementary School

From 1922 to 1975 (when Sacred Heart High School was relocated downtown), Sacred Heart grammar school and high school were located in the East End. All 12 grades were located next to Sacred Heart Church. A kindergarten, convent and rectory are on the grounds.

== Services ==
A police precinct sits in the East End with two fire stations.. There are medical walk-in clinics run by one of the downtown hospitals as a "branch clinic".

=== Fire services ===
Apparatus	Fire House
Engine 5	1956 East Main Street
Engine 2	519 East Main Street
Truck 3	519 East Main Street

== Government ==
Though the neighborhood is under Waterbury's jurisdiction, representatives of the East End represent at city and state level. The East End Community Club is a resident-run organization to promote continuity within the neighborhood.
