= Dallis Flowers =

American football player (born 1997)

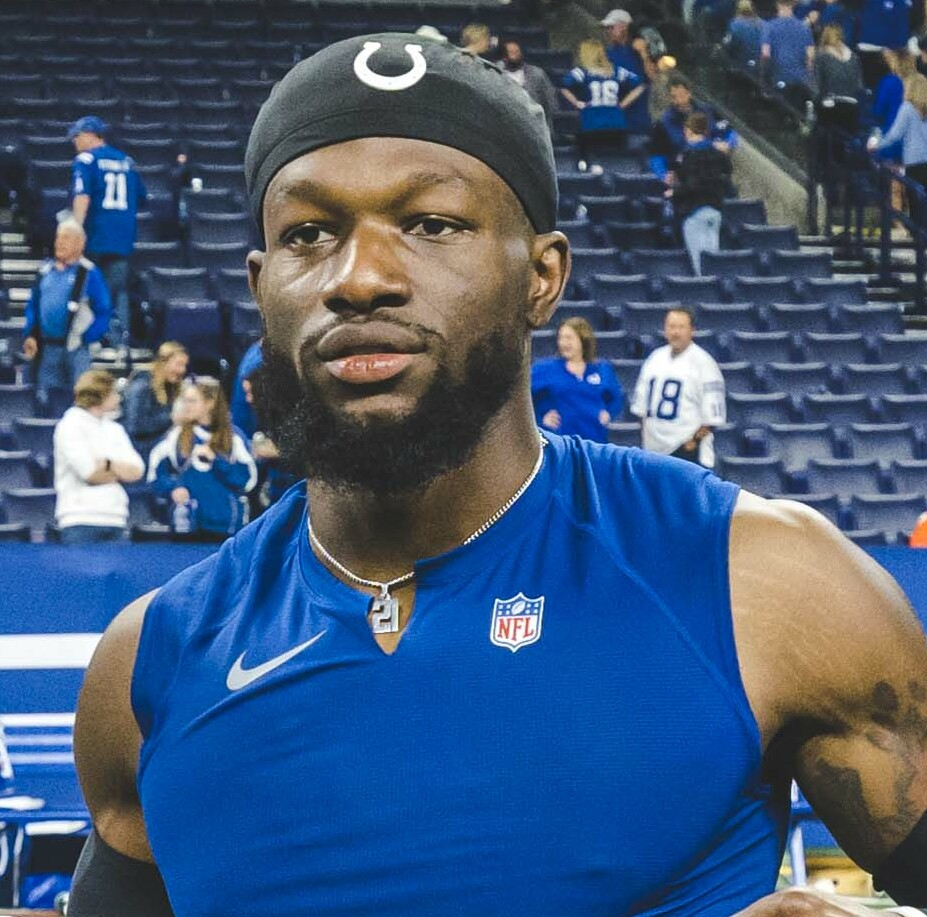
- Flowers with the Indianapolis Colts in 2022

No. 37 – Chicago Bears
- Position: Cornerback
- Roster status: Injured reserve

Personal information
- Born: June 4, 1997 (age 29); Chicago, Illinois, U.S.
- Listed height: 6 ft 1 in (1.85 m)
- Listed weight: 196 lb (89 kg)

Career information
- High school: Oak Park-River Forest (Oak Park, Illinois)
- College: Grand View (2016–2020); Pittsburg State (2021)
- NFL draft: 2022: undrafted

Career history
- Indianapolis Colts (2022–2024); Tampa Bay Buccaneers (2024)*; San Francisco 49ers (2025)*; Chicago Bears (2025–present)
- * Offseason or practice squad member only

Awards and highlights
- PFWA All-Rookie Team (2022); 2× NAIA First-team All-American (2018, 2019)

Career NFL statistics as of 2025
- Total tackles: 39
- Forced fumbles: 1
- Fumble recoveries: 1
- Pass deflections: 3
- Return yards: 764
- Stats at Pro Football Reference

Dallis Flowers (born June 4, 1997) is an American professional football cornerback for the Chicago Bears of the National Football League (NFL). He played college football for the Grand View Vikings and Pittsburg State Gorillas, and signed with the Indianapolis Colts after going undrafted in the 2022 NFL draft.

== Early life ==
On September 1, 2023 Oak Park and River Forest High School retired Flowers' number. Flowers, who wore 21 as a varsity starter for three years, will be the second Oak Park and River Forest High School Football player to be honored with a jersey retirement.

== Professional career ==
Pre-draft measurables
Height	Weight	Arm length	Hand span	Wingspan	40-yard dash	10-yard split	20-yard split	20-yard shuttle	Three-cone drill	Broad jump
6 ft 1 in (1.85 m)	196 lb (89 kg)	32 in (0.81 m)	9 7/8 in (0.25 m)	6 ft 6 1/4 in (1.99 m)	4.43 s	1.47 s	2.56 s	4.34 s	6.98 s	10 ft 11 in (3.33 m)
All values from Pro Day

=== Indianapolis Colts ===
On April 30, 2022, Flowers signed with the Indianapolis Colts as an undrafted free agent, following the 2022 NFL draft. He made the Colts' 53 man roster out of training camp. Flowers was the team's primary kick returner, and led the league with 31.1 yards per return. He was named to the PFWA All-Rookie Team.

Flowers entered the 2023 season as a starting cornerback alongside Kenny Moore II. He suffered an Achilles injury in Week 4 and was placed on season-ending injured reserve on October 3, 2023.

The day following their Week 5 game against the Jacksonville Jaguars in the 2024 season, Flowers was waived by the Colts. He appeared responsible for allowing an 85-yard touchdown pass to rookie wide receiver Brian Thomas Jr., as well as a contributing factor in a four-yard touchdown strike to tight end Brenton Strange in the fourth quarter.

=== Tampa Bay Buccaneers ===
On October 15, 2024, Flowers signed with the Tampa Bay Buccaneers practice squad. He signed a reserve/future contract on January 14, 2025.

On April 29, 2025, Flowers was waived by the Buccaneers.

=== San Francisco 49ers ===
On May 9, 2025, Flowers signed a one-year deal with the San Francisco 49ers. He was waived on August 26 as part of final roster cuts.

=== Chicago Bears ===
On September 9, 2025, Flowers was signed to the Chicago Bears' practice squad. On September 20, Flowers was activated to the gameday roster and appeared in one game for the Bears against the Dallas Cowboys, recording one tackle.

On January 20, 2026, Flowers signed a reserve/futures contract with Chicago. He was placed on injured reserve due to a right leg injury on August 7.
