= Oak Park Regional Housing Center =

Apartment-rental agency in Oak Park, Illinois, USA

The Oak Park Regional Housing Center (OPRHC) is a non-profit located within the village of Oak Park, Illinois. The Housing Center provides direct services in Oak Park and surrounding communities throughout Chicago and western Cook County.

== Mission ==
Since 1972, OPRHC has worked to sustain racial integration and affirmatively further fair housing in Oak Park and the surrounding communities. The Housing Center strives to reconnect neighborhoods by ensuring access to quality housing, regardless of race, gender, religious views, sexual orientation, familial status, or disability.

== History ==
In 1963, citizen groups began to lobby for an open housing legislation. From this, in 1968, the Village of Oak Park adopted the Fair Housing Ordinance. In the early 1970s, African American families began to integrate into Oak Park. Many faced discrimination in neighboring communities so in 1972, Roberta "Bobbie" Raymond opened the Oak Park Housing Center to ensure equal access to housing. The idea for the Housing Center came from her master’s thesis. The Housing Center initially launched with a staff of twenty and approximately twelve relators willing to show their clients housing in Oak Park. Since then the Oak Park Housing Center became the Oak Park Regional Housing Center to highlight the mission to integrate not only Oak Park, but also to encourage fair housing throughout the entire region. The center has been featured by the American Planning Association for being the third best neighborhood in the US, the hit television show The View for being named one of the top five sexiest suburbs in the United States, Travel and Leisure magazine named Oak Park one of the most beautiful neighborhoods, and Chicago Magazine votes Oak Park one of the twenty best towns and neighborhoods in Chicago and the suburbs.

== Oak Parker ==
The Oak Parker Magazine is the distinctive voice on the history, culture, and diverse lifestyles that shape the Oak Park community. This magazine has been published by the Oak park Regional Housing Center since 2011. In addition to the print version of the magazine, theoakparker.com is a regularly updated source for events and topics including home decor, finance, health, food & culture, and monthly features of local businesses.

== Rental advising ==
Oak Park’s housing market is 40% rental and over one-third of renters move every year. Every day, the Oak Park Regional Housing Center helps prospective renters make affirmative moves by encouraging clients to consider moves that will sustain or improve Oak Park’s integration. Despite the numerous obstacles for sustaining racial integration, 800 of their clients made affirmative moves in 2011, 575 of the moves were in Oak Park. That is a 67% affirmative rate for Oak Park, 20 percentage points higher than moves to Oak Park that are without the Oak Park Regional Housing Center. Their numbers continue to grow year after year. In 2010, 700 renters came the OPRHC in search of housing and by 2011, this number grew to 869.

== Fair housing advocacy and policy ==
The Oak Park Regional Housing Center provides leadership and partners with organizations and jurisdictions at the local, state, and national level. They promote equitable public policy by consulting with the agencies at the federal, state, and local level. In addition, they are large supporters of local policy and encourage inter-jurisdictional collaboration in order to ensure that the integration in Oak Park spreads throughout the region.

== Landlord technical assistance ==
The Housing Center offers technical assistance to local landlords. Training includes screening consistency, pre-lease agreements, proper notices, compliance with landlord/tenant and fair-housing laws, unit standards, and property management. The Technical Assistance program also previews apartments and connects landlords with grant dollars and loans to improve the quality of the units and overall building. This department also markets apartment listings to perspective residents and educates clients to ensure that the apartment listings they receive fit their preferences and budget.

== West Cook Homeownership Center ==
The West Cook Homeownership Center works to ensure that people of all races and incomes have access to homeownership. Programs include financial fitness, downpayment assistance, employer-assisted housing, and first-time homebuyer seminars. The West Cook Homeownership Center is also a part of the Neighborhood Stabilization Program, allowing the agency to rehab and market homes within communities of West Suburban Cook County.

== Community engagement ==
The Housing Center recognizes that fair housing connects to all other facets of society. Therefore, the Housing Center works closely with the Village of Oak Park and numerous local agencies to promote sustainable and racially integrated community initiatives. In 2012, the Oak Park Regional Housing Center launched the Young Integration Leaders Alliance (YILA) in partnership with Oak Park River Forest High School and the Minority Student Achievement Network. The alliance is a hands-on, discussion based education program offered to high school students that ends with a summer internship. The group focuses on racial integration and provide opportunities for leadership within the high school and larger community.

== Sources ==
- "Oak Park Regional Housing Center". oprhc.org.
- "How Oak Park Became Oak Park". The Oak Parker. theoakparker.com.
- "America's Most Beautiful Neighborhoods". Travel + Leisure. travelandleisure.com.
- "Oak Park: 20 Best Towns and Neighborhoods in Chicago and the Suburbs". Chicago magazine. chicagomag.com. April 2010.
- Evan McKenzie and Jay Ruby (13 October 2002). "Reconsidering The Oak Park Strategy: The Conundrums Of Integration" (PDF). Archived from the original (PDF) on 2014-09-04.
- "West Cook Homeownership Center: 7740 Madison Street, Forest Park, IL 60130". westcookhomeownership.org.
- "The Illinois Housing Development Authority". ihda.org.
- "Buying a Home/U.S. Department of Housing and Urban Development (HUD)". portal.hud.gov.
- "Neighborhood Stabilization Program Grants/U.S. Department of Housing and Urban Development (HUD)". portal.hud.gov. Archived from the original on August 16, 2011.
- "Oak Park Regional Housing Center: 1041 South Blvd, Oak Park". liveinoakpark.com.
