= St. Thomas More School (Connecticut) =

Location
- 45 Cottage Road; Oakdale, New London County, Connecticut 06370; United States; 41.511609°N 72.219382°W

Information
- Type: Independent college-preparatory boarding & day high school
- Religious affiliation: Christianity
- Denomination: Catholic
- Patron saint: Thomas More
- Established: 1962
- Founder: James Hanrahan
- Status: Currently operational
- NCES School ID: 00233421
- Head of school: Matthew Quinn
- Faculty: 18 (on an FTE basis)
- Grades: 8–12
- Gender: Mixed-sex
- Enrollment: 144 (2021-2022)
  - Grade 8: 5
  - Grade 9: 10
  - Grade 10: 23
  - Grade 11: 35
  - Grade 12: 71
- Average class size: 8
- Student to teacher ratio: 8:1
- Hours in school day: 6
- Campus size: 110 acres (45 ha)
- Campus type: Fringe rural
- Colors: White & Navy Blue
- Nickname: Chancellors
- Accreditation: NEASC
- Annual tuition: $59,900
- Affiliations: NAIS, TABS
- Website: stmct.org

St. Thomas More School is a college-preparatory school in Oakdale, Connecticut, United States. The school serves grades 8–12 and postgraduate courses. It is accredited by the New England Association of Schools and Colleges and is a member of the National Association of Independent Schools.

== History ==
The school was established in 1962 by James Hanrahan. Located on Gardner Lake, the school also includes international students from several countries; St. Thomas More was founded as a Christian school, however, students from other religions are also welcomed and accepted.

== Athletics ==
Sports offered at St. Thomas More include basketball, football, soccer, tennis, golf, and badminton. Previously, the school has also offered baseball, lacrosse, and wrestling.

Over the years, the athletics program at St. Thomas More has gained national relevance, especially basketball, with athletes joining the school to improve their grades and earn better opportunities to play at NCAA Division I level. Numerous school alumni have played at the Division I and professional levels in basketball and football.

== Notable alumni ==
- Bryon Allen (born 1992), basketball player for Hapoel Eilat of the Israeli Basketball Premier League
- Dwayne Anderson, professional basketball player and coach
- Charlie Brown Jr. (born 1997), NBA player
- Trahson Burrell, professional basketball player
- Ed Cota, professional basketball player
- Schea Cotton, professional basketball player
- Ajou Deng, professional basketball player
- Quincy Douby, NBA player
- Andre Drummond, NBA player
- Devin Ebanks, NBA player
- A. J. English, professional basketball player
- Steven Enoch, professional basketball player
- Shahar Gordon (born 1980), Israeli professional basketball player
- Carl Krauser, professional basketball player
- Damion Lee, NBA player
- Gabe Levin (born 1994), American-Israeli basketball player in the Israeli Basketball Premier League
- Charles Minlend (born 1973), professional basketball player, 2003 Israeli Basketball Premier League MVP
- Josh A. Moore, professional basketball player
- Eric Paschall, NBA player
- Miles Scott (born 2002), NFL player
- Joel Soriano, professional basketball player
- Omari Spellman, NBA player
- Zion Tracy (born 2004), college football cornerback for the Penn State Nittany Lions
- Edwin Ubiles, NBA player
- Mario Van Peebles, actor and director
- Winston Venable, professional football player
- Christian Vital (born 1997), basketball player in the Israeli Basketball Premier League
- Yuta Watanabe (born 1994), NBA player
