= River Forest Public Schools =

School district in Illinois, United States

River Forest Public Schools District 90 is a school district headquartered in River Forest, Illinois in the suburbs of Chicago.

There are three schools in the district: Lincoln Elementary School, which is the elementary school for the south part of River Forest, Willard Elementary School, which is the elementary school for the north part of River Forest, and Roosevelt Middle School, which serves as the middle school for all of River Forest. The elementary schools go from Kindergarten to 4th Grade, and Roosevelt goes from 5th grade to 8th grade. The current (as of 2024) enrollment is around 1,370. Almost all of the area of River Forest is in this district, and the remaining part is zoned for recreational/institutional use. Students matriculate to Oak Park and River Forest High School.
