= Troy Bradford =

American basketball player (born 1966)

Personal information
- Born: May 30, 1966 (age 60) Hamden, Connecticut, U.S.
- Listed height: 5 ft 10 in (1.78 m)
- Listed weight: 181 lb (82 kg)

Career information
- High school: Wilbur Cross High School (New Haven, Connecticut)
- College: Fairfield (1985–1989)
- Playing career: 1991–1999
- Position: Point guard

Career highlights
- Connecticut Player of the Year (1985); 1st Team All-MAAC (1988); Preseason All-American (1989); 3x 1st Team Small American (1987–1989)

Troy Bradford (born May 30, 1966) is an American former professional basketball player who played the point guard position. Bradford played college basketball for Fairfield University where he was named a preseason All-American in 1989 and 1st team Small American for three straight years between 1987 and 1989.

== Playing career ==
=== High school ===
Bradford is a native of Hamden, Connecticut and attended Wilbur Cross High School in New Haven, Connecticut. During his senior season in 1985, Bradford led the Wilbur Cross Governors to the 1985 CT LL boys basketball state championship and #2 national ranking while earning McDonald's All American nominee and Connecticut Player of The Year recognition.

=== College ===
Bradford played college basketball for Fairfield University in Fairfield, Connecticut from 1985 to 1989 where he left as the school's 4th all-time leading scorer with over 1,600 points. He holds several school records including the single-season record for points scored (646, 1988), single-season scoring average (22.7, 1988) and free throws made in a single game (21, 1988). In 1987, Bradford was the sixth leading scorer in the nation (26.7) and 2nd in the nation in percentage points of the team's total (33%). In 1988, Bradford was named 1st Team All-MAAC and All-MET. Bradford was named a preseason All-American in 1989 and 1st team Small American for three straight years between 1987 and 1989. In 1989, Bradford competed in the first annual Slam Dunk contest at the Final Four in Seattle, Washington where he placed 5th among the nation's best dunkers. In 2001, Bradford was inducted into the Fairfield University Athletic Hall of Fame. Bradford is the last Stag to average more than twenty points per game in a single season in 1988 and 1989.

=== Professional ===
From 1992 to 1998, Bradford played professional basketball in Cartagena, Spain and Brunico, Italy. During the summers of 1991 to 1993, he played in the USBL for the Connecticut Skyhawks and the Tampa Bay Sunblasters. From 1993 to 1995, Bradford played in the NBA Summer League and was among the league leaders in points per game (21.7) and assists (6). From 1997 to 1999 Troy played in the ABA for the Lehigh Valley Colonials and served as the player head coach. He was 2nd in the league in scoring (24.5ppg) and assists (6apg).
