= Roberta L. Raymond =

American actress, writer, and sociologist (1938–2019)

Roberta Lee Raymond, née Roberta Wolin (November 16, 1938 – May 7, 2019), also known as Bobbie Raymond, was an American actress, sociologist, civil rights worker, artist, and writer. She was married to mathematician Richard Gustavus Larson, PhD and had one son Charles D. Raymond, and a grandson Trevor William Raymond.

== Early acting career ==
Raymond was born and grew up in Oak Park, Illinois. She worked as a child actor in Chicago from 1946 until 1952. In her first professional role she played the child on the record album The Christmas Story.

Using the stage name Roberta Alden, she worked in radio, television, film, and on stage. She guest starred on Jack Armstrong, the All-American Boy, Cricket on the Hearth, and other NBC radio network shows. She performed on many radio commercials, including commercials for Salerno Butter Cookies, Hawthorne Melody Milk, and Coronet Magazines. On television, she guest starred in such shows as The Magic Slate, Super Circus, Tinker O'Toole, Uncle Mistletoe, and The Jack Carter Show. Her stage career included Nash Motor Car industrial shows at the Civic Opera House. She worked in film at Wilding Picture Productions, where she appeared in trade films for Kraft Foods and Squibb Pharmaceuticals and, most notably, in The Growth of a Nation, a trade film produced by The American Feed Manufacturers Association. At Coronet Films in Glenview, Illinois, she starred in Parties Are Fun, produced by David A. Smart.

In New York City, Raymond acted in numerous radio, television, film, and stage productions. Television work included guest appearances on Jerry Lewis NBC Spectacular, An American Girl, Armstrong Circle Theatre, the U. S. Steel Hour, New York Confidential, Too Young to Go Steady, and Lamp Unto My Feet and on the soap operas Search for Tomorrow and Love of Life. She was featured in television commercials for the National Brewers Association, Union Carbide, Suave, Redi-Whip, Lava Soap, Canada Dry Ginger Ale, and Alka-Seltzer. Touring the Catskills with the Stanley Woolf Players in 1958 she earned the coveted Actors Equity membership card. Raymond had a lead role in the 1960 pre-Broadway try-out of Tender Loving Care with John Payne.

== Education and career in sociology ==
Raymond pivoted from show business to sociology, beginning with her undergraduate studies at Drake University, The New School for Social Research, and at Hunter College.

In 1966 while living in Oak Park, Raymond became concerned about racial integration in housing. The Austin neighborhood in Chicago that bordered Oak Park had recently failed to integrate, and white middle-class families fled for the suburbs. Raymond became active in the Oak Park and River Forest Citizens Committee for Human Rights, a fair housing group designed to work for passage of a fair housing law and to promote integration in the then all-white suburbs. At that time many communities were working for passage of local fair housing ordinances, including Oak Park, and Raymond was instrumental in passing the 1968 Fair Housing Ordinance. Her work in fair housing became increasingly important to her, and she decided to go to graduate school to study sociology. Her experience as a fair housing volunteer combined with extensive research became the basis of her master's thesis in sociology at Roosevelt University in Chicago, which concentrated on racial change in Oak Park. The thesis, "The Challenge to Oak Park: A Suburban Community Faces Racial Change" earned her a master's degree with high honors in 1972. The thesis became the springboard for Oak Park's early planning for a long-term racially diverse community and led to Raymond's founding in 1972 of the Oak Park Housing Center (later the Oak Park Regional Housing Center) in office space donated by the First Congregational Church on Lake Street in Oak Park. Arguing that "a community attempting to maintain integration had a better chance than a community that resisted," Housing Center volunteers actively worked to encourage continuing demand from whites while opening new opportunities for minorities by counseling housing seekers to promote neighborhood diversity and integration. In 1976 the Housing Center moved to its permanent site at 1041 South Boulevard.

During Raymond's 27 years as executive director, the success of the Oak Park Housing Center was recognized nationally and internationally. In 1973 the Housing Center was named one of the top housing programs in the United States by the Department of Housing and Urban Development. In 1974 the documentary film As Time Goes By: Oak Park, Illinois premiered at the Lake Theater in Oak Park and on television on WTTW. The film was reviewed both favorably and skeptically in Chicago papers and in Variety. In 1976, the accomplishments of the Housing Center, along with the Oak Park Village Mall and the Frank Lloyd Wright Home and Studio, earned Oak Park the coveted All-America City Award. Raymond wrote the winning presentation script. The award was a turning point for Oak Park. It brought extensive publicity and recognition from the National Municipal League and Chicago daily papers. An ABC documentary Oak Park: All American followed.

In 1978 the Housing Center and Raymond were featured on 60 Minutes. Raymond appeared alongside William Bradford Reynolds, then-U.S. Assistant Attorney General in the Reagan Administration, to discuss racial quotas on the last Phil Donahue Show filmed in Chicago. In 1991 she was featured on the BBC Radio Documentary Race in America. She participated in a panel discussion of why Chicagoans were leaving the city on Chicago Tonight in 1993. She is featured in the book Save Our Land Save Our Towns as well as in numerous newspaper and magazine articles over the years, sometimes controversially. In 1996 Raymond stepped down as executive director of the Housing Center.

Raymond was an original committee member and national vice president of The Oak Park Exchange Congress, founded in 1977. The Exchange Congress was an organization of fair housing groups from Illinois, Ohio, Michigan, New Jersey, New York, and other states. Members met annually for nearly fifteen years to discuss integration; racial diversity in housing, schools, and religion; and economic development. Through the Oak Park Exchange Congress, the "Oak Park Strategy" became a model for integration nationally.

Fifty years later, Oak Park remains racially diverse. Predictions based on U.S. Census data in the late 1960s and early 1970s by Pierre de Vise and Anthony Downs envisioned Oak Park gradually re-segregating from white to black, particularly in the area between the two rapid transit lines. These predictions did not come to pass—primarily because of the programs initiated in Oak Park as outlined in Raymond's thesis. Village government joined with the Housing Center to initiate dozens of programs, such as code enforcement, loans to improve apartment building security, training of apartment building managers and realtors, previewing of apartments to determine marketability, and encouraging thousands of Housing Center clients to consider moves which contributed to diversity. Raymond focused on integration strategies into the 1990s, saying, "Over the next two decades, we're going to have to look more and more beyond our own borders."

Raymond's commitment to integration was consistent throughout her activities. Her background in acting, advertising, and art, along with her close personal ties in the community, helped Raymond promote the benefits of integration beyond the Oak Park Strategy for housing. She deftly extended her organizing skills into opportunities to demonstrate the success of the Oak Park Strategy by pressing art, sports, architecture, and documentary film into the service of racial diversity.

In the late-1960s Raymond organized the first exhibit of art by black artists in Oak Park. The show, 25 Negro Artists in Illinois, was held at the Oak Park Public Library.

In 1980 Raymond worked with the Austin Schock Historical Association and others to found the Austin Village House Tour, a popular tour of architecturally significant homes in the Austin neighborhood of Chicago that featured homes designed by the architect Frederick Schock. In its inaugural year the House Tour attracted over 1000 people. For seventeen years the House Tour promoted the image of the Austin community, helped to improve the relationship between Oak Park and Austin, and, for a while, helped bring banks and investors into the Austin neighborhood. In 1986, due to the efforts of The Austin Schock Historical Association and volunteers like Raymond, Austin Village was designated an historic district by the Chicago Commission on Architectural and Historic Landmarks and added to the National Register of Historic Places.

In 1983 Raymond and many sponsors started the Boulevard Run 10K Race through Oak Park and Austin. She served as Race Director for all ten years that the race was run. The race annually attracted around 1200 runners and brought Oak Park and Chicago metro runners into Columbus Park and the Austin Village neighborhood. It was awarded the Chicago Area Runners Association Best 10K Race Award.

In the 1996 oral history project documentary series, Legends of Our Time, Raymond interviewed Lewis Pope. The quarterback of the 1937 Oak Park champion varsity football team, Pope was denied the chance to play in the Orange Bowl in Miami because tournament officials would not allow a black player at the game. Raymond also moderated a panel discussion on diversity in Oak Park that highlighted the black working-class families who had lived in the village since the late 1880s and the hard-fought success of integration in the 1970s when many neighboring communities were rapidly re-segregating along racial lines.

Raymond served on the boards of the Oak Park Development Corporation, The Doris Humphrey Foundation, The Oak Park and River Forest Alumni Association, The Ernest Hemingway Foundation, the Oak Park Art League, National Neighbors, and the Chicago Area Fair Housing Alliance.

Raymond received many awards and honors throughout her life. She was recognized by The Chicago Daily News in the column "Doers: People Who Keep Chicago on the Go" in 1977. In 1987 she received the Community Merit Award from the Oak Park Development Corporation. For her support of the arts and work in developing artist housing in Oak Park she received the 1989 Patron of the Arts Award. She received the 1990 award from the National Organization for Women (west Suburban Chapter) for Outstanding Achievement in the Field of Social Welfare. In 1990 she also received the Tradition of Excellence Award from Oak Park and River Forest High School. She was named one of the 25 most influential Oak Parkers in 1991 and again in 1995. The Illinois Chamber of Commerce awarded Raymond the Athena Award for women leaders, and then-State Senator Judy Baar Topinka honored Raymond with State of Illinois 87th General Assembly Senate Resolution No. 1615. Roosevelt University awarded Raymond the Eleanor Roosevelt Humanitarian Award in 1996. That same year she was named a Living Legend in Oak Park. In 2000 Raymond received the Studs Terkel Humanities Service Award from the Illinois Humanities Council. In 2007 Raymond was interviewed about Percy Julian for the television series NOVA. Raymond can be heard discussing real estate for sale signs on the WBEZ Chicago radio show Curious City and her role in integration of Oak Park on the nationally syndicated NPR radio show BackStory.

== Contributions in fine arts ==
Raymond's art gives expression to her deep admiration and love for nature. As an artist, she is known for her watercolor paintings of such subjects as the rare wild orchids of Door County, Wisconsin; the flowers and sea creatures of the Caribbean, and portrait and figure drawing. Her paintings have been exhibited in juried shows at the Francis Hardy Gallery, The Paint Box Gallery, and the Door County Art League in Ephraim, Wisconsin and the Oak Park Art League, The Oak Park Conservatory, Oak Park Village Hall, the Oak Park Public Library, the Ernest Hemingway Foundation, The Frank Lloyd Wright Home and Studio, and Expressions Graphics in Oak Park. Her paintings were the featured illustrations on menus for US Air during the 1990s. In 1995 she illustrated The Gift to be Simple Bread Book. In 2014 her Sunflower watercolor painting was chosen to promote the Oak Park Farmers Market.

Raymond's work is collected in the United States, Canada, and France.

== Career author of fiction and nonfiction ==
Raymond began her writing career as an advertising copywriter in the 1960s. She went on to write numerous articles on fair housing, including a Chicago Sun-Times magazine piece entitled "Open Housing Success" and her landmark study of black history in Oak Park, published by Pioneer Press, which documented the existence of a black community in Oak Park dating from the 1870s. Based on oral history interviews, this was the first published work on Oak Park's early black history. In 1982, Raymond's article, "Racial Diversity: A Model for American Communities," was published by the Illinois Advisory Committee to the United States Commission on Civil Rights. She wrote numerous newspaper articles on civil rights and black history.

From 2000 to 2002 Raymond wrote a weekly gardening column for the Wednesday Journal.

Raymond wrote and illustrated two children's books. Amy and the Amaryllis was chosen for national recognition in 2015 by the National Garden Clubs, Inc. The Ocean Conservancy contributed the last page of Three Sea Tales and in 2015 featured the book as the only children's book for summer reading. Three Sea Tales was reviewed favorably in Chicago Life Magazine and The Door County Pulse

Her one-act play, An Imaginary Interview with Elizabeth Louise Vigée Le Brun, has been performed regionally since 2013.

== Death and remembrance ==
Raymond died on May 7, 2019, in Chicago of congestive heart failure. She had been battling an extended illness.

A bust honoring Raymond was erected in front of the Oak Park Arts League on Chicago Avenue in Oak Park in 2021.
