= Kermit E. Krantz =

American physician

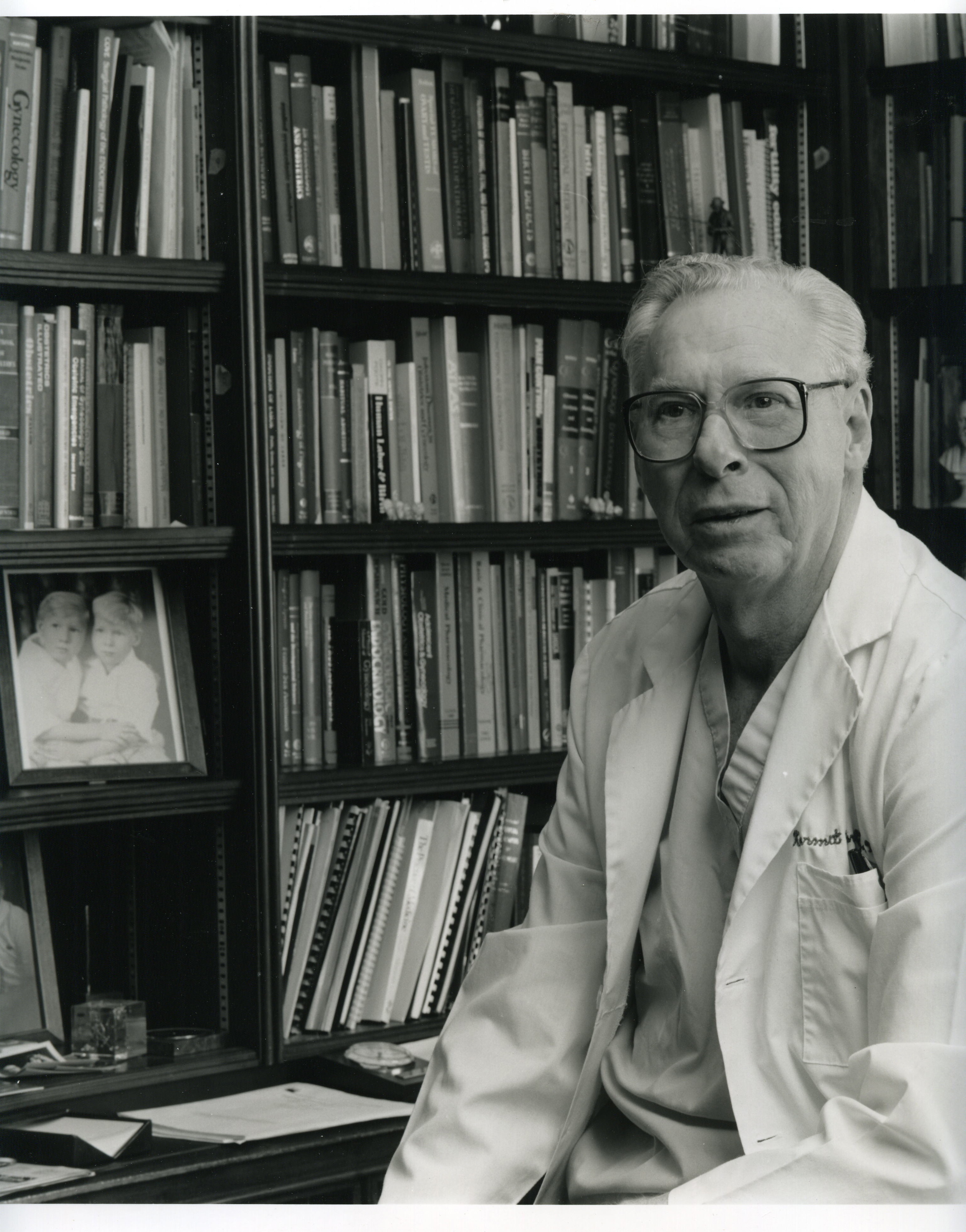
- Born: Kermit Edward Krantz; June 4, 1923; Oak Park, Illinois, US
- Died: July 30, 2007 (aged 84); Prairie Village, Kansas, US
- Education: Northwestern University
- Occupations: Obstetrician and gynecologist
- Spouse: Doris Cole (c. 1945–2007; his death)

Kermit Edward Krantz (June 4, 1923 – July 30, 2007) was a surgeon, inventor and faculty member at the University of Kansas Medical Center. He is most known as the co-developer of the Marshall-Marchetti-Krantz (MMK), a medical procedure for stress urinary incontinence which he performed over 5000 times. He served as Chairman of Obstetrics and Gynecology at the University of Kansas School of Medicine. He was largely credited with desegregating the maternity ward of that hospital in the 1960s.

== Personal life ==
Krantz, an identical twin and the youngest of eight children, was born June 4, 1923, in Oak Park, Illinois. He worked his way through school college and medical school performing research, curating a museum for Northwestern University anatomy professor Leslie Arey, and selling newspapers, as he had lost both of his parents by the age of 13.

He was married to Doris Cole (1920–2014) for 62 years.

Krantz died on July 30, 2007, in Kansas City, Kansas, from the complications of a stroke.

== Academics and work history ==
- Dr. Krantz graduated from Northwestern University with a Bachelor of Science (1945), a Master of Science in Anatomy (1947), and a Medical Doctorate (1948)
- He served his residency at both the Cornell Medical College (NYC) at New York Lying-In Hospital (now New York-Presbyterian Hospital) and at the University of Vermont
- Held the position of Assistant Professor at the University of Vermont
- Held the position of Assistant Professor at the University of Arkansas
- Held the position of (Full) Professor of Anatomy and Professor of Obstetrics and Gynecology
- He served as Chairman of Obstetrics and Gynecology at the University of Kansas for 31 years
- 1990 he was honored as the first University Distinguished Professor at the University of Kansas School of Medicine
- Associate to the Executive Vice-Chancellor for Facilities Development
- Dean for Clinical Affairs (Chief of Staff) at KUMC (1972–1974)
- Over 75 books, journals or book contributions were credited to Dr. Krantz, along with nine medical educational/instructional movies

== Awards, honors, and service ==
- Endowed Chair at the University of Kansas; Kermit E. Krantz Professor and Chair of Obstetrics and Gynecology
- Markel Scholar in Medical Science (1957)
- Bowens-Brooks Fellow – New York Academy of Medicine
- Literary (honorary) Doctorate from William Woods University
- Foundation Prize, 1950, American Gynecological and Obstetrical Society
- Distinguished Service Award from the American College of Obstetrics and Gynecologists
- Won the American College of Obstetricians and Gynecologists' "Robert A. Ross Award" 12 times (from 1972–1983, more than any other) for his work with the Navy
- The American College of Obstetricians and Gynecologists award the "Kermit E Krantz Award" for service in the Armed Forces' Air Force Section, in honor of Dr. Krantz since 1983.
- In 1985, he received the Department of the Army Outstanding Civilian Service Award, one of the highest civilian awards the US Army/Pentagon can bestow.
- Won the American College of Obstetricians and Gynecologists' "Col. Edward Zimmermann Award" in 1981 for his work with the Army
- University of Kansas Honorary Medical Alumnus Award, 1994
- Listed on the Hall of Fame at Oak Park and River Forest High School
- Executive Committee of the National Association of Planned Parenthood Physicians
- President of the Society of Medical Consultants of the Armed Forces
- Chief civilian consultant to the Surgeon General
- Chairman for the Committee on Gynecological Practice/American College of Obstetrics and Gynecologists
- Association of Professors of Gynecology and Obstetrics/Wyeth Career Achievement Award (1988)
- Examiner for the American Board of Gynecologists
- Scientific Advisory Board for the Armed Forces Institute of Pathology (1984–1992)
- In 2004, Northwestern University honored Dr. Krantz by dedicating the Arey/Krantz Museum of Anatomy at the Feinberg School of Medicine.
- 32nd Degree Mason
- President of the International Family Planning Research Associates

== Innovations ==
Beyond the MMK, Krantz held four patents, including:

- Expansible tampon
- Surgical closure device and method
- Surgical stent

== Sources ==
- University of Kansas Medical Center & KU School of Medicine
- Northwestern University, Feinberg School of Medicine Annual report
- US Patent and Trademark Office
- Kansas City Star Obituaries Page
- American College of Obstetricians and Gynecologists
