= A.F. Cappelli Block =

Historic building

- A. F. Cappelli Block
- U.S. National Register of Historic Places
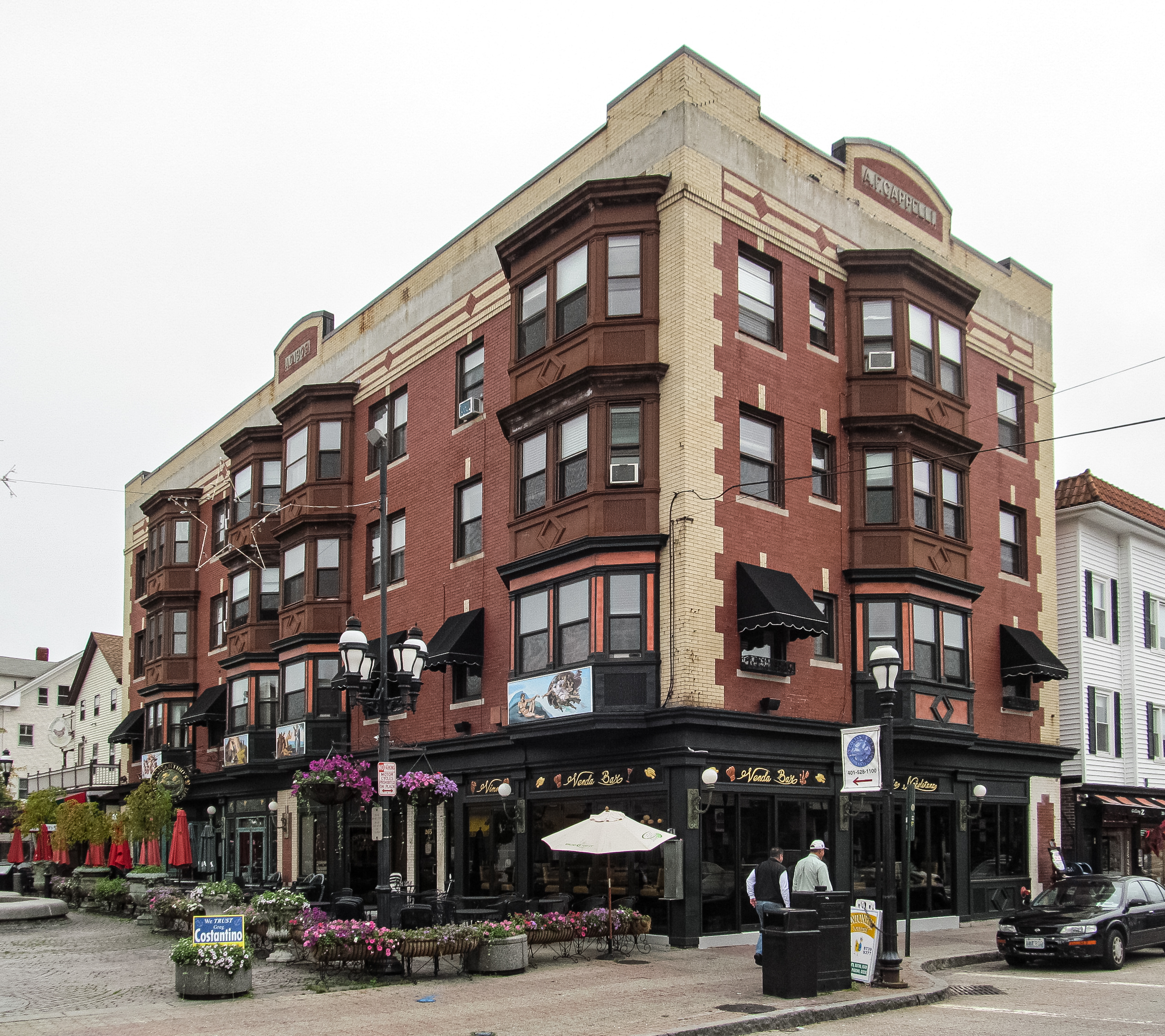

- Location within Rhode Island
- Location: Providence, Rhode Island
- Coordinates: 41°49′24″N 71°25′38″W
- Built: 1909
- NRHP reference No.: 80000090
- Added to NRHP: March 3, 1980

The A.F. Cappelli Block is a historic mixed-use commercial and residential building at 263 Atwells Avenue, facing DePasquale Plaza in the Federal Hill neighborhood of Providence, Rhode Island. It is a four-story brick structure, with two storefronts on the ground floor, and residential units on the upper floors. It is faced in red brick, with tan bricks at the corners giving it a quoined appearance. The store fronts feature original cast iron finishes. It was built in 1909 by Antonio Cappelli, and was (then as now) one of the tallest buildings in the Federal Hill area.

The block was listed on the National Register of Historic Places in 1980.

== See also ==
- National Register of Historic Places listings in Providence, Rhode Island
