= Oak Park Elementary School District 97 =

School district in Illinois, United States

Coordinates: 41°52′48.8″N 87°46′56.3″W

Oak Park Elementary School District 97 is a school district that operates 10 schools in Oak Park, Illinois, United States: eight elementary schools (K–5, unless otherwise noted) and two middle schools (6–8). The district has 459.4 teachers (FTEs) serving 5492 students for a Pupil/Teacher ratio of 15.

The feeder high school is Oak Park and River Forest High School.

School Facts
School name	Students	FTE Teachers	Pupil/Teacher Ratio
Abraham Lincoln Elementary School	565	50.6	15
Gwendolyn Brooks Middle School	951	72	16
Horace Mann Elementary School	396	34.8	13
Washington Irving Elementary School	527	43.6	15
Longfellow Elementary School	567	50.1	14
Oliver W Holmes Elementary School	459	37.1	14
Percy Julian Middle School	911	72.8	15
John Greenleaf Whittier Elementary School	436	41.4	16
Notes	Also has a pre-kindergarten program
William Beye Elementary School	357	30.2	16
William Hatch Elementary School	323	26.7	14

Note: Based on 2002–2003 school year data
