= James Hanrahan =

American basketball player (1923–2006)

Personal information
- Born: September 14, 1923 Waterbury, Connecticut, U.S.
- Died: May 31, 2006 (aged 82) Oakdale, Connecticut, U.S.

Career information
- High school: Crosby (Waterbury, Connecticut)
- College: Georgetown
- Position: Guard

Career history
- 1947–1948: Hartford Hurricanes

James Fox Hanrahan (September 14, 1923 – May 31, 2006) founded the St. Thomas More School in Oakdale, Connecticut in 1962 and served as the school's Headmaster until 1997 and Chancellor thereafter. Before founding the St. Thomas More School he was the 3rd men's college basketball head coach of the Fairfield University Stags from 1950 to 1958 while teaching at the Fairfield College Preparatory School. He was inducted into the Fairfield University Athletics Hall of Fame in 1993.

Jim was a high school basketball star at Crosby High School in Waterbury, CT. After high school he spent seven years at St. Mary's Seminary in Baltimore, MD studying to become a Catholic Priest before enrolling at Georgetown University and graduating in 1947. He attended Georgetown University on a basketball scholarship, however, his athletic career was cut short by an ankle break after just three games. He earned a master's degree from Fairfield University in 1952.
