= Fred Barakat =

American college basketball coach

Fred Barakat (from Union City, New Jersey, April 8, 1939 – June 21, 2010) was an American college basketball coach and Assistant Commissioner of the Atlantic Coast Conference.

Barakat was a 1961 graduate of Assumption College in Worcester, MA where he was a two-time All-America basketball player for the Greyhounds.

He was a territorial draft selection of the New York Knicks (NBA) and also had a baseball try-out with the San Francisco Giants. He played five years in the Eastern Basketball Pro League.

He returned to Assumption as an assistant basketball coach in the fall of 1966 and as head soccer coach.

Barakat became the sixth men's college basketball coach of the Fairfield University Stags in 1970 and is the all-time most successful coach in the school's history (160–128). He led the Stags to three National Invitation Tournament appearances (1973, 74, 78) including the programs' first post-season berth as a Division I program in 1973. An 80–76 win over Marshall was the program's first National Invitation Tournament victory. He also led the team to three E.C.A.C. regionals in 1977, 78 and 80. The Stags 22–5 mark in 1977–78 was a then-school record.

He joined the staff of the Atlantic Coast Conference in 1981 as Assistant Commissioner and in 2000 received the additional title of Director of Men's Basketball Operations.

He was inducted into the Assumption College Alumni Association Athletic Hall of Fame in 1975 and the Fairfield Hall of Fame in 1990. A native of Union City, NJ, he was graduated from Emerson High and was also inducted into Emerson High (1998) and Hudson County (1999) Hall of Fames.

Barakat resided in Greensboro, NC with his wife, Florence, and was the parent of four adult children: Nancy, Christie, Amy, and Rick. Barakat died in Greensboro of a heart attack on June 21, 2010, at the age of 71. His daughter Nancy is currently the Mayor of Greensboro.

For all of his contributions to basketball and the Atlantic Coast Conference, Barakat was inducted into the Guilford County Sports Hall of Fame in 2015.
