= Joe DeSantis =

Biographical details
- Born: September 24, 1957 (age 69); The Bronx, New York, U.S.

Playing career
- 1975–1979: Fairfield
- Position: Guard

Coaching career (HC unless noted)
- 1981–1988: Fairfield (assistant)
- 1989–1992: Duquesne (assistant)
- 1992–1994: Pittsburgh (assistant)
- 1995–1996: St. John's (assistant)
- 1996–2007: Quinnipiac

Head coaching record
- Overall: 118–188

Joe DeSantis (born September 24, 1957) is the color commentator for the radio and TV broadcasts of Fairfield Stags men's basketball and is a member of the New England Basketball Hall of Fame. He was the second longest tenured head men's basketball coach at Quinnipiac University.

DeSantis is best remembered as "Joey D" and his role in leading the 1978 Fairfield Stags men's basketball team to a program best 22–5 overall record, a victory over the then #14 nationally ranked Holy Cross Crusaders, and a berth in the National Invitational Tournament.

== Coaching career ==
DeSantis was the fifth head coach of the Quinnipiac University men's basketball team. During his 11 seasons coaching the Bobcats, DeSantis guided the program through the transition from Division II to Division I while compiling an overall 118–188 record. In 2001–02, despite being a #7 seed, the Bobcats reached the Northeast Conference (NEC) championship game in its first-ever NEC postseason appearance. In 1999–2000, DeSantis was named NEC Coach of the Year by CBSSportsLine.com after guiding the Bobcats to an 18–10 mark, their first winning season since 1992–93 and their most wins since 1987–88.

DeSantis also served as an assistant at his alma mater, Fairfield University, for seven years (1981–88) during which the Stags twice won the Metro Atlantic Athletic Conference and qualified for the 1986 and 1987 NCAA Men's Division I Basketball Tournaments.

DeSantis now runs the DeSantis Basketball Academy.

== Collegiate career ==
DeSantis attended Fairfield University, where he was an AP All-American Honorable Mention in 1979, First Team All New England in 1978–79 and UPJ First Team All New England in 1979. DeSantis holds the Stags records for most field goals (727) and lifetime free throw percentage (.849, 462–544) and ranks second for career points (1,916) and career assists (622). DeSantis also set the Stags' single season free throw percentage record of .892 during the 1976–77 season which ranked fifth in the nation.

DeSantis was elected to Fairfield University Alumni Sports Hall of Fame in 1985 and the New England Basketball Hall of Fame in 2004 for his playing contributions with the Stags.

== Professional career ==
The Washington Bullets selected DeSantis in the second round of the 1979 NBA draft. DeSantis opted to play with Reyer Venezia Mestre in the Lega Basket Serie A in 1979–80, where he achieved all-star status. He completed his professional career with the Maine Lumberjacks in the Continental Basketball Association.
