= Gregory W. Cappelli =

American business executive

Gregory W. Cappelli (born c. 1968) is an American business executive who specializes in national education policy. He is the CEO of Apollo Education Group, a Fortune 1000 company and the parent company of the University of Phoenix, as well as chairman of Apollo Global, a subsidiary company that invests money in educational institutions.

== Apollo Education Group ==
Cappelli began working at Apollo Education Group ("Apollo") in 2007, serving as executive vice president of global strategy and assistant to the executive chairman. He was appointed co-CEO of Apollo on April 27, 2009, at the age of 41. As co-CEO, he shared the role with Chas Edelstein. The two men had worked together at Credit Suisse before each joined Apollo Group. Three years later, he became the sole CEO of the Apollo.

In 2012, Mother Jones named him one of the ten most overpaid CEOs.

=== Workforce ===
In 2015, Apollo created a business unit called Apollo Professional Development which train employees at Fortune 1000 companies. Chief Executive Magazine called Cappelli "passionate about creating a skilled workforce for employees".

== Boards, media appearances and recognition ==
Cappelli is a former member of the board of directors members of Everybody Wins!, located in New York He is on the Board of Governors of the Boys and Girls Club of America and the board of trustees of his graduate school alma mater, Dominican University.

A few days after the 2012 presidential election, he was on a live C-SPAN television special called "Voter Demographics and 2012 Elections". He served as a panelist offering his insight and answering questions from the audience.

== Education ==
He graduated with a B.A. in economics from Indiana University. He later received an MBA from Dominican University.
