= Charge transfer switch =

A charge transfer switch OR CTS charge pump is a charge pump that offers better low-voltage performance and "a better voltage pumping gain and a higher output voltage" than previous charge pumps such as the Dickson charge pump.

== See also ==
- Charge pump
