= Electrostatic septum =

An electrostatic septum is a dipolar electric field device used in particle accelerators to inject or extract a particle beam into or from a synchrotron. In an electrostatic septum, basically an electric field septum, two separate areas can be identified, one with an electric field and a field free region. The two areas are separated by a physical wall that is called the septum. An important feature of septa is to have a homogeneous field in the gap and no field in the region of the circulating beam.

== The basic principle ==
Electrostatic septa provide an electric field in the direction of extraction, by applying a voltage between the septum foil and an electrode. The septum foil is very thin to have the least interaction with the beam when it is slowly extracted. Slowly means over millions of turns of the particles in the synchrotron. The orbiting beam generally passes through the hollow support of the septum foil, which ensures a field free region, as not to affect the circulating beam. The field free region is achieved by using the hollow support of the septum and the septum foil itself as a Faraday cage. The extracted beam passes just on the other side of the septum, where the electric field changes the direction of the beam to be extracted. The septum separates the gap field between the electrode and the foil from the field free region for the circulating beam. Electrostatic septa are always sitting in a vacuum tank to allow high electric fields, since the vacuum works as an insulator between the septum and high voltage electrode. To allow precise matching of the septum position with the circulation beam trajectory, the septum is often fitted with a displacement system, which allows parallel and angular displacement with respect to the circulating beam. Great difficulty lies in the choice of materials and the manufacturing techniques of the different components. In the figure a typical cross section of an electrostatic septum is shown. The septum foil and its support are marked in blue, while the electrode is marked in red. In the lower part of the figure the electric field E is shown as it could be measured on the axis indicated as a dotted line in the cross section. The field free region is inside the support of the septum foil. The electric field E in the gap between the septum foil and the electrode is homogeneous on the axis and is equal to:

$$E = - \frac{V}{d}$$

Where V is the voltage applied to the electrode and d is the distance between the septum foil and the electrode.

== Typical technical specifications ==
Typical device specifications are listed below.

- Electrode length: 500 – 3000 mm
- Gap width: variable between 10 – 35 mm
- Septum thickness: 0.1 mm
- Vacuum: (10^{−9} to 10^{−12} mbar range)
- Electric field strength: up to 15 MV/m
- Voltage: up to 300 kV
- Septum materials: Molybdenum foil, Tungsten Rhenium alloy wires, Tungsten Rhenium alloy ribbons
- Electrode materials: stainless steel, anodised aluminium or titanium for extreme low vacuum applications
- Bakeable up to 200 °C for low vacuum applications
- Power supplied by high voltage Cockcroft–Walton generator
