= Dynamitron =

Electrostatic particle accelerator

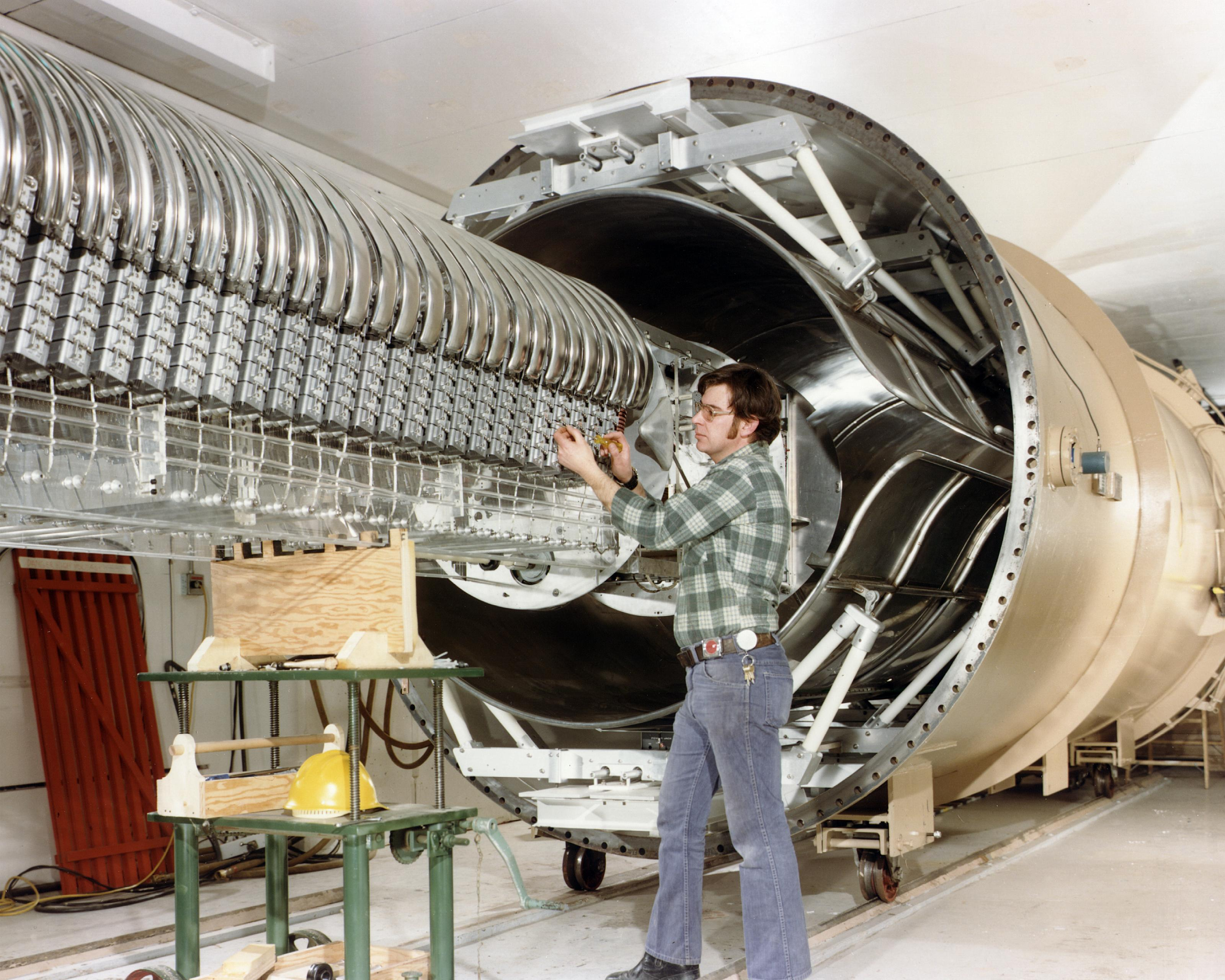
Dynamitron

The Dynamitron is an electrostatic particle accelerator invented by Marshal Cleland in 1956 at Washington University in St. Louis and manufactured by Electron Equipment Experts LLC. It is similar to a Cockcroft-Walton accelerator, using a series capacitor-diode ladder network to generate a high DC voltage on an electrode, which accelerates particles through an evacuated beam tube between the electrode and a target at ground potential. However instead of being powered at one end as in the Cockcroft-Walton, the capacitive ladder is charged in parallel electrostatically by a high frequency oscillating voltage applied between two long half-cylindrical electrodes on either side of the ladder column, which induce voltage in semicircular corona rings attached to each end of the diode rectifier tubes. in combination with an inductor this structure forms a resonant tank circuit for the oscillator providing the voltage, at a frequency of 100 kHz. The alternating voltage across the diodes pumps charge in one direction up the series stack of diodes to the high voltage electrode as in the Cockcroft-Walton circuit. The advantage of this design is that it can produce higher beam currents than the Cockcroft-Walton design, up to hundreds of milliamperes, and the high frequency reduces the ripple on the accelerating voltage. The accelerator stack is inside a tank of pressurized sulfur hexafluoride gas for insulation. It can accelerate either electrons or positive ions, and tandem versions have been built.

The Dynamitron is made in several models with output energies from 0.5 to 5 MeV and beam power from 50 to 200 kW. Its main use is in industrial irradiation applications; the most common are polymer crosslinking for production of heat shrink tubing, and shrink wrap plastic film for food packaging, sterilization, and curing of plastic foam and tire components. Around 200 units are in operation, primarily in the US. A number have been installed in university research settings including the University of Birmingham in the UK and Tohoku University in Japan A modern research application for Dynamitrons is as a high intensity neutron source. They are particularly suited for neutron production via the Lithium (p,n) reaction with potential applications in neutron imaging, activation analysis and Boron Neutron Capture Therapy.
