= Cockcroft–Walton generator =

Electric circuit that generates high DC voltage from low-voltage AC or pulsing DC input

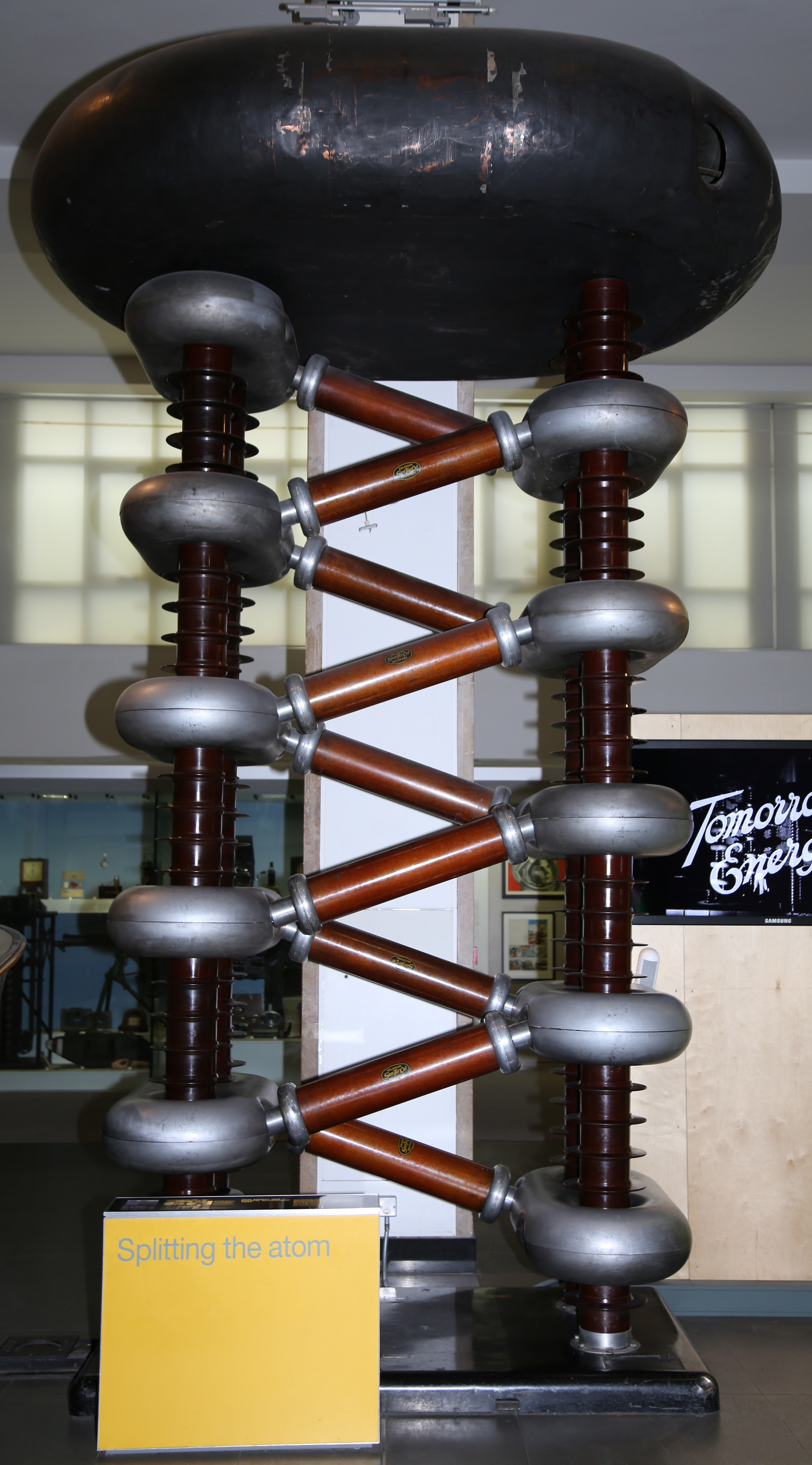
This Cockcroft–Walton particle accelerator was used during the development of the atomic bomb. Built in 1937 by Philips of Eindhoven it is now in the National Science Museum in London, England.

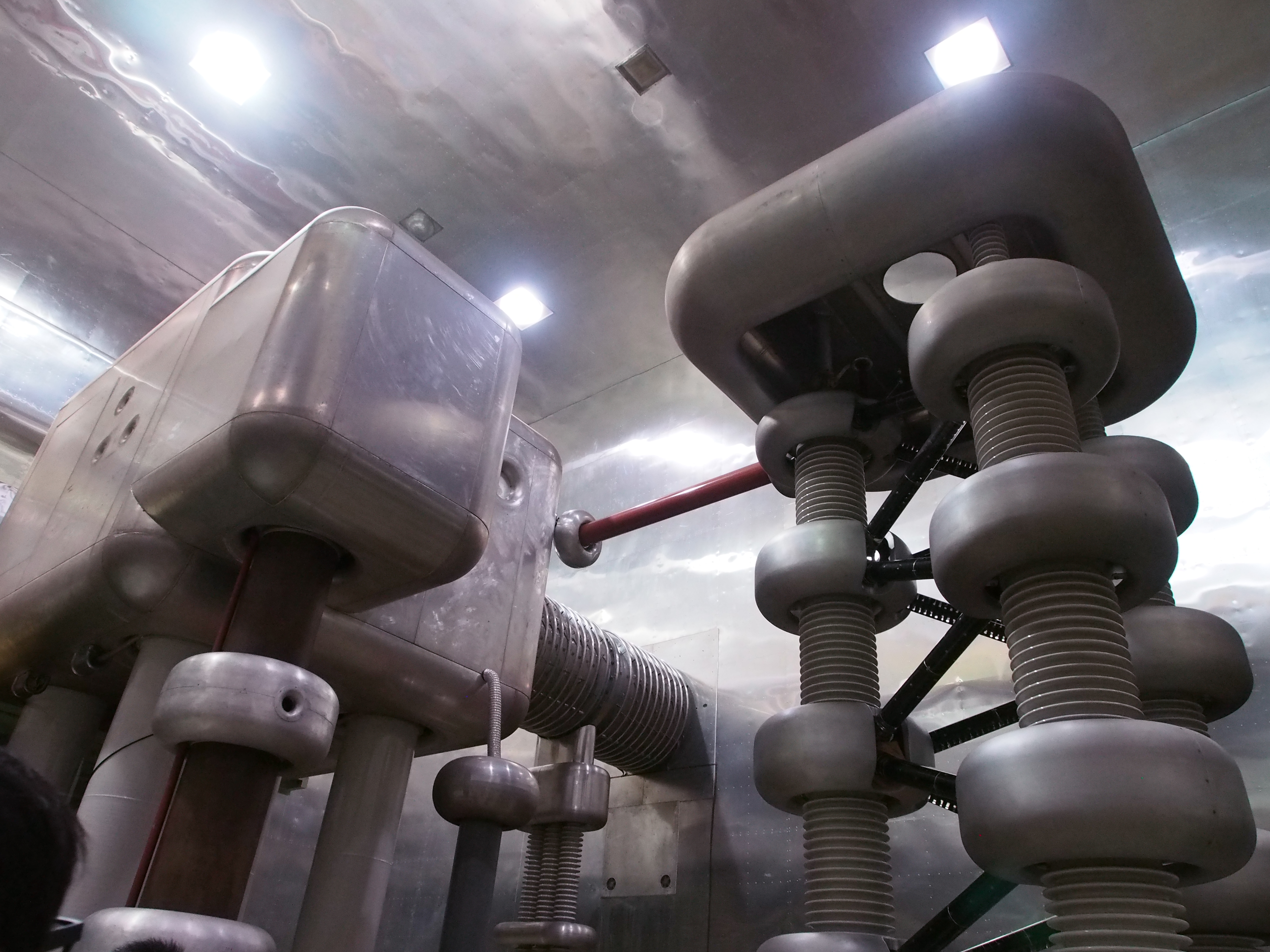
750 kV Cockcroft-Walton accelerator used as the initial particle injector of the Japanese KEK accelerator, Tsukuba, Japan. The CW generator is on the right, the particle source is on the left.

The Cockcroft–Walton (CW) generator, or multiplier, is an electric circuit that generates a high DC voltage from a low-voltage AC. It was named after the British and Irish physicists John Douglas Cockcroft and Ernest Thomas Sinton Walton, who in 1932 used this circuit design to power their particle accelerator, performing the first accelerator-induced nuclear disintegration in history. They used this voltage multiplier cascade for most of their research, which in 1951 won them the Nobel Prize in Physics for "Transmutation of atomic nuclei by artificially accelerated atomic particles".

The circuit was developed in 1919, by Heinrich Greinacher, a Swiss physicist. For this reason, this doubler cascade is sometimes also referred to as the Greinacher multiplier. Cockcroft–Walton circuits are still used in particle accelerators. They also are used in everyday electronic devices that require high voltages, such as dental X-ray machines and air ionizers.

== Operation ==
A two-stage Cockcroft–Walton multiplier

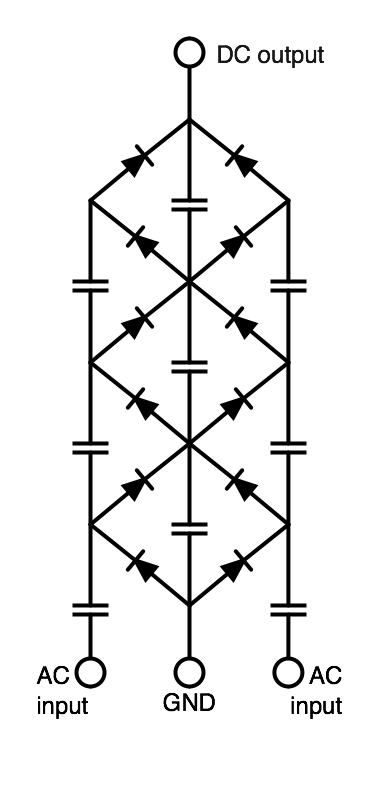
A three-stage full-wave CW multiplier

The CW generator is a voltage multiplier that converts AC electrical power from a low voltage level to a higher DC voltage level. It is made up of a voltage multiplier ladder network of capacitors and diodes to generate high voltages. Unlike transformers, this method eliminates the requirement for the heavy core and the bulk of insulation/potting required. Using only capacitors and diodes, these voltage multipliers can step up relatively low voltages to extremely high values, while at the same time being far lighter and cheaper than transformers. The biggest advantage of such circuits is that the voltage across each stage of the cascade is equal to only twice the peak input voltage in a half-wave rectifier. In a full-wave rectifier it is three times the input voltage. It has the advantage of requiring relatively low-cost components and being easy to insulate. One can also tap the output from any stage, like in a multi-tapped transformer.

To understand the circuit operation, see the diagram of the two-stage version at right. Assume all capacitors are initially uncharged, and the circuit is powered by an alternating voltage V_{i} such that V_{i} = V_{p} sin(t + π), i.e. with a peak value of V_{p}, which after power-on is 0 volts and starts with a negative half-cycle. After the input voltage is turned on

- When the input voltage V_{i} is decreasing and approaching its negative peak −V_{p}, current flows from the bottom terminal of the source, through diode D1 and then through capacitor C1, charging it. V_{i} eventually reaches the negative peak −V_{p}, at which point C1 is charged to a voltage of V_{p}. V_{i} then starts increasing ‒ its derivative dV_{i}/dt reverses sign from negative to positive. When this happens, the current reverses its direction, since the load placed on the source is almost purely capacitive and thus current leads voltage by almost 90°.
- When V_{i} is increasing and approaching its positive peak +V_{p}, current flows from the top terminal of the source, through C1 (discharging it), through diode D2, and finally through capacitor C2 (charging it). Eventually, V_{i} reaches +V_{p}, and when we add to it the voltage of C1 (which is now slightly below +V_{p}), we get the resulting voltage of almost 2V_{p} ‒ this is the voltage to which C2 is charged. In this phase, diode D1 is reverse-biased, so no current flows through it.
- When V_{i} starts decreasing again (dV_{i}/dt is negative), current flows from the bottom terminal of the source, through C2 (discharging it), through diode D3, through C3 (charging it to a voltage of almost 2V_{p}), and finally through C1 (recharging it to V_{p}, after it was partially discharged in the previous phase). Since some voltage is dropped also on C1 and not just on C3, C3 will not be charged to 2V_{p} immediately, but only in later iterations. The same applies to C1 and V_{p} respectively. Also, in this phase, C2 discharges to a voltage below 2V_{p}, similarly to C1 in the previous phase. It will be recharged in the next phase.
- When V_{i} begins to increase again, current flows from the top terminal of the source, through C1 and C3 (discharging them), through diode D4, through C4 (charging it to a voltage of almost 2V_{p}), and finally through C2 (recharging it). During this phase, C1 and C3 discharge below V_{p} and 2V_{p} respectively, and will be recharged in the following phase.

At any given moment, either the odd-numbered diodes are conducting, or the even-numbered ones, never both. With each change in the derivative of input voltage (i.e. dV_{i}/dt), current flows up to the next level in the "stack" of capacitors through the diodes. Eventually, after a sufficient number of cycles of the AC input, all capacitors will be charged. (More precisely, we should say their actual voltages will converge sufficiently close to the ideal ones ‒ there will always be some ripple from the AC input). All the capacitors are charged to a voltage of 2V_{p}, except for C1, which is charged to V_{p}. The key to the voltage multiplication is that while the capacitors are charged in parallel, they are connected to the load in series. Since C2 and C4 are in series between the output and ground, the total output voltage (under no-load conditions) is V_{o} = 4V_{p}.

This circuit can be extended to any number of stages. The no-load output voltage is twice the peak input voltage multiplied by the number of stages N or equivalently the peak-to-peak input voltage swing (V_{pp}) times the number of stages

$$V_o = 2NV_p = NV_\text{pp},$$

The number of stages is equal to the number of capacitors in series between the output and ground.

One way to look at the circuit is that it functions as a charge "pump", pumping electric charge in one direction, up the stack of capacitors. The CW circuit, along with other similar capacitor circuits, is often called a charge pump. For substantial loads, the charge on the capacitors is partially depleted, and the output voltage drops according to the output current divided by the capacitance.

== Characteristics ==
In practice, the CW has a number of drawbacks. As the number of stages is increased, the voltages of the higher stages begin to "sag", primarily due to the electrical impedance of the capacitors in the lower stages. And, when supplying an output current, the voltage ripple rapidly increases as the number of stages is increased (this can be corrected with an output filter, but it requires a stack of capacitors in order to withstand the high voltages involved). For these reasons, CW multipliers with large number of stages are used only where relatively low output current is required. The sag can be reduced by increasing the capacitance in the lower stages, and the ripple can be reduced by increasing the frequency of the input and by using a square waveform. By driving the CW from a high-frequency source, such as an inverter, or a combination of an inverter and HV transformer, the overall physical size and weight of the CW power supply can be substantially reduced.

CW multipliers are typically used to develop higher voltages for relatively low-current applications, such as bias voltages ranging from tens or hundreds of volts to millions of volts for high-energy physics experiments or lightning safety testing. CW multipliers are also found, with a higher number of stages, in laser systems, high-voltage power supplies, X-ray systems, CCFL LCD backlighting, traveling-wave tube amplifiers, ion pumps, electrostatic systems, air ionisers, particle accelerators, copy machines, scientific instrumentation, oscilloscopes, television sets and cathode-ray tubes, electroshock weapons, bug zappers and many other applications that use high-voltage DC.

The Dynamitron is similar to the Cockcroft–Walton generator. However instead of being powered at one end as in the Cockcroft-Walton, the capacitive ladder is charged in parallel electrostatically by a high frequency oscillating voltage applied between two long half-cylindrical electrodes on either side of the ladder column, which induce voltage in semicircular corona rings attached to each end of the diode rectifier tubes.

== Image gallery ==
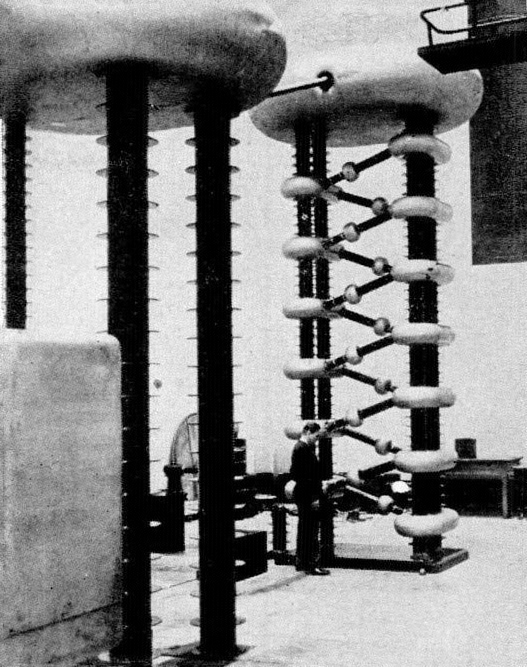
1.2 MV 6-stage Cockcroft–Walton accelerator at Clarendon Lab, Oxford University in 1948

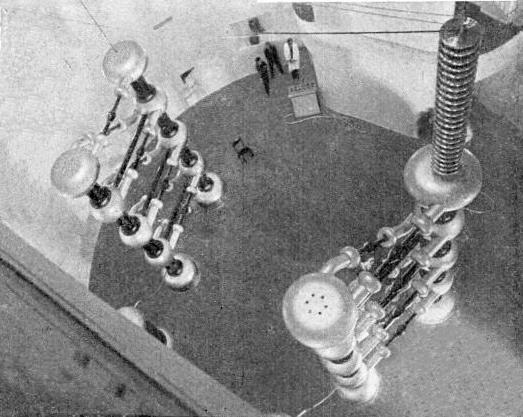
3 MV CW accelerator at Kaiser Wilhelm Institute, Berlin in 1937, said to be the most powerful CW at the time (the two 4-stage ladders produced opposite polarity). Note the three human figures at top center for scale.

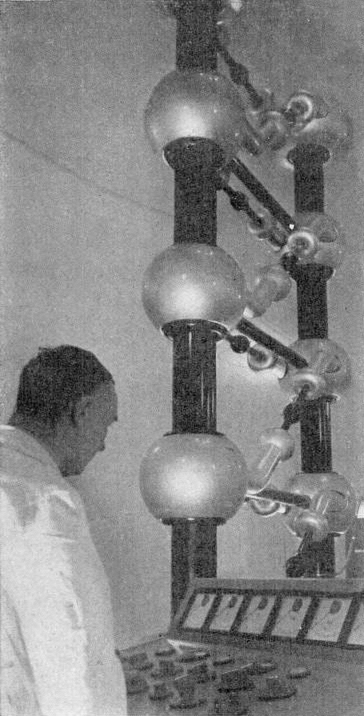
Control panel of the Kaiser Wilhelm machine

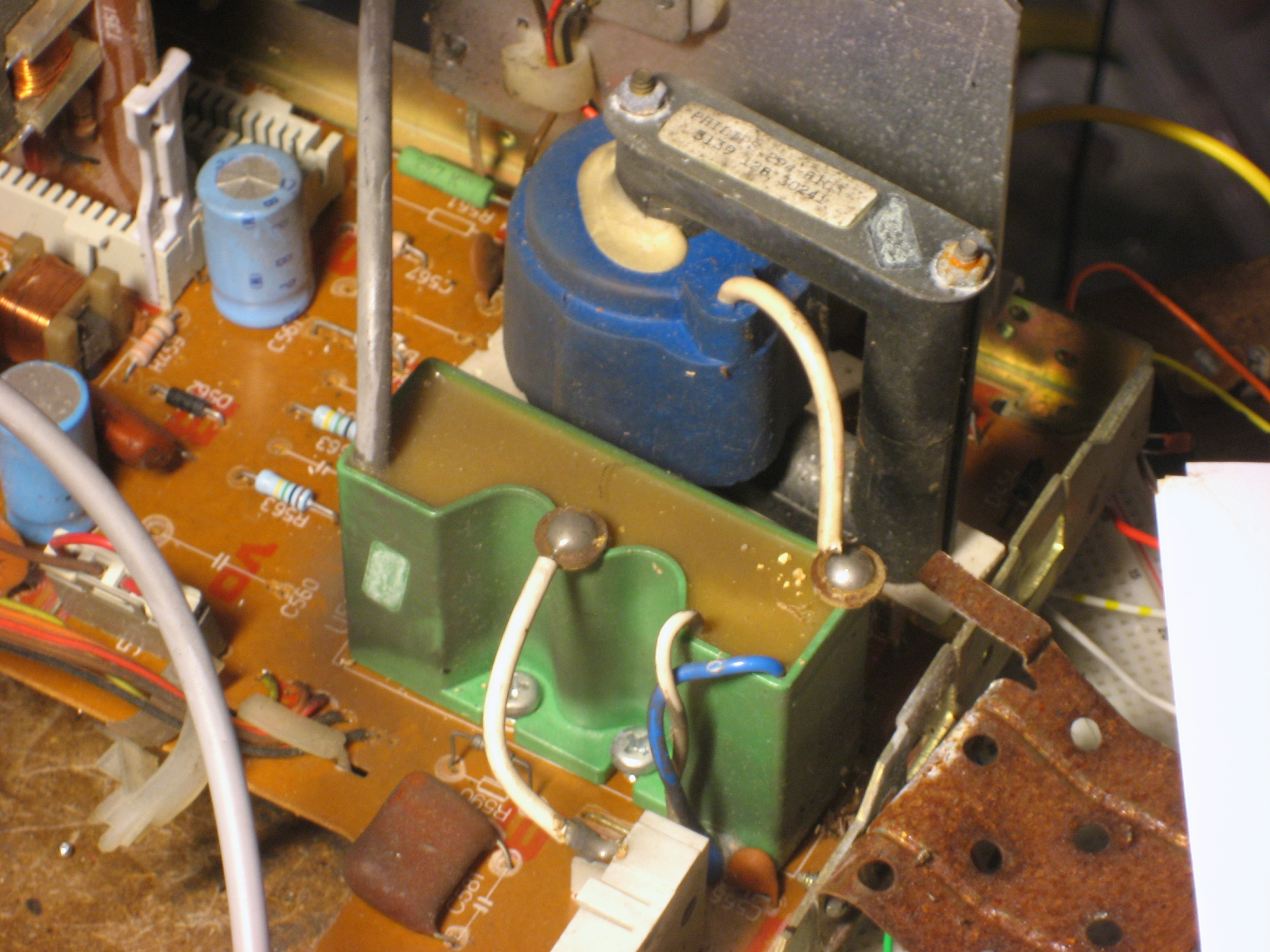
3-stage semiconductor diode cascade multiplier (green) in anode supply of a cathode-ray tube television set

== See also ==
- Marx generator
- Voltage multiplier
