= List of Duquesne University people =

This is a list of notable persons affiliated with Duquesne University, including alumni, current and former faculty members, and students.

== Notable alumni ==
=== Media ===
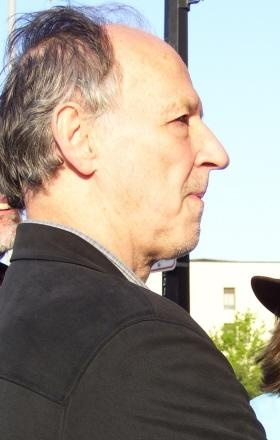
German filmmaker Werner Herzog briefly attended Duquesne University.

- Tom Atkins – actor, Lethal Weapon, The Rockford Files, Harry O, Oz
- Carl Betz – actor, The Donna Reed Show, Judd for the Defense
- Peter Brunette – film critic (The Hollywood Reporter) and film historian
- John Clayton (1976) – NFL writer and reporter for ESPN
- Werner Herzog – filmmaker (did not officially graduate)
- Bill Hillgrove (1962) – sports journalist, radio personality, broadcaster
- Jesse Joyce – stand-up comedian and writer
- Mark Madden – former World Championship Wrestling commentator, writer, ESPN Radio personality
- Terry McGovern – film actor, television broadcaster, radio personality, voice-over specialist, and acting instructor
- Mary Rawson – television producer, writer, talk show host, actor

=== Business ===
- Alan N. Braverman – senior executive vice president, secretary, and general counsel of The Walt Disney Company, 2003–present
- Pat Dudley (MA) – president and marketing director of Bethel Heights Vineyard
- Ed Grier – former president of the Disneyland Resort in Anaheim, California
- Stanley R. Gumberg – real estate developer
- Tom Tribone – founder and CEO of Guggenheim Global Infrastructure Company

=== Religion ===
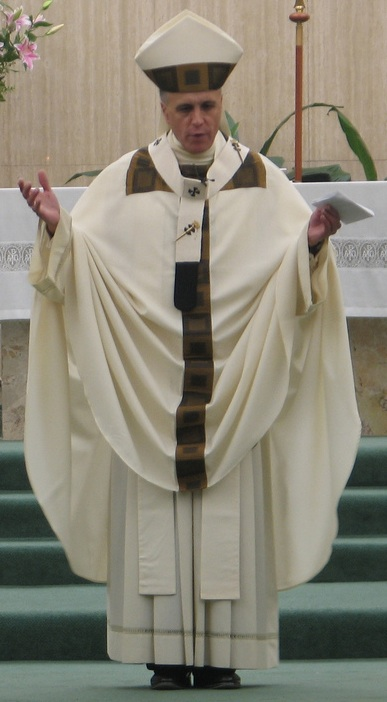
Archbishop Daniel DiNardo of Galveston-Houston

- Richard Henry Ackerman – bishop of Covington (Kentucky), 1960–1978; attended the Second Vatican Council
- Daniel DiNardo (1969) – archbishop of the Roman Catholic Archdiocese of Galveston-Houston (2006–2025)
- Mark Eckman – Bishop of Pittsburgh (2025-present)
- Ralph Leo Hayes – bishop of Helena (1933–1935), rector of the Pontifical North American College (1935–1944), and bishop of Davenport (1944–1966)
- Vincent Leonard – bishop of Pittsburgh (1969–1983)
- Zola Levitt – Messianic Jewish teacher, author, and television host
- Adam Joseph Cardinal Maida (1964) – cardinal, archbishop of Detroit (1990–present)
- Thomas L. Thompson (1962) – Biblical theologian, closely associated with the Biblical minimalism movement
- Anne Nasimiyu Wasike (died 2018) – theologian, religious sister, and author
- David Zubik (1971) – bishop of Green Bay (2003–2007), bishop of Pittsburgh (2007–2025)

=== Sports ===
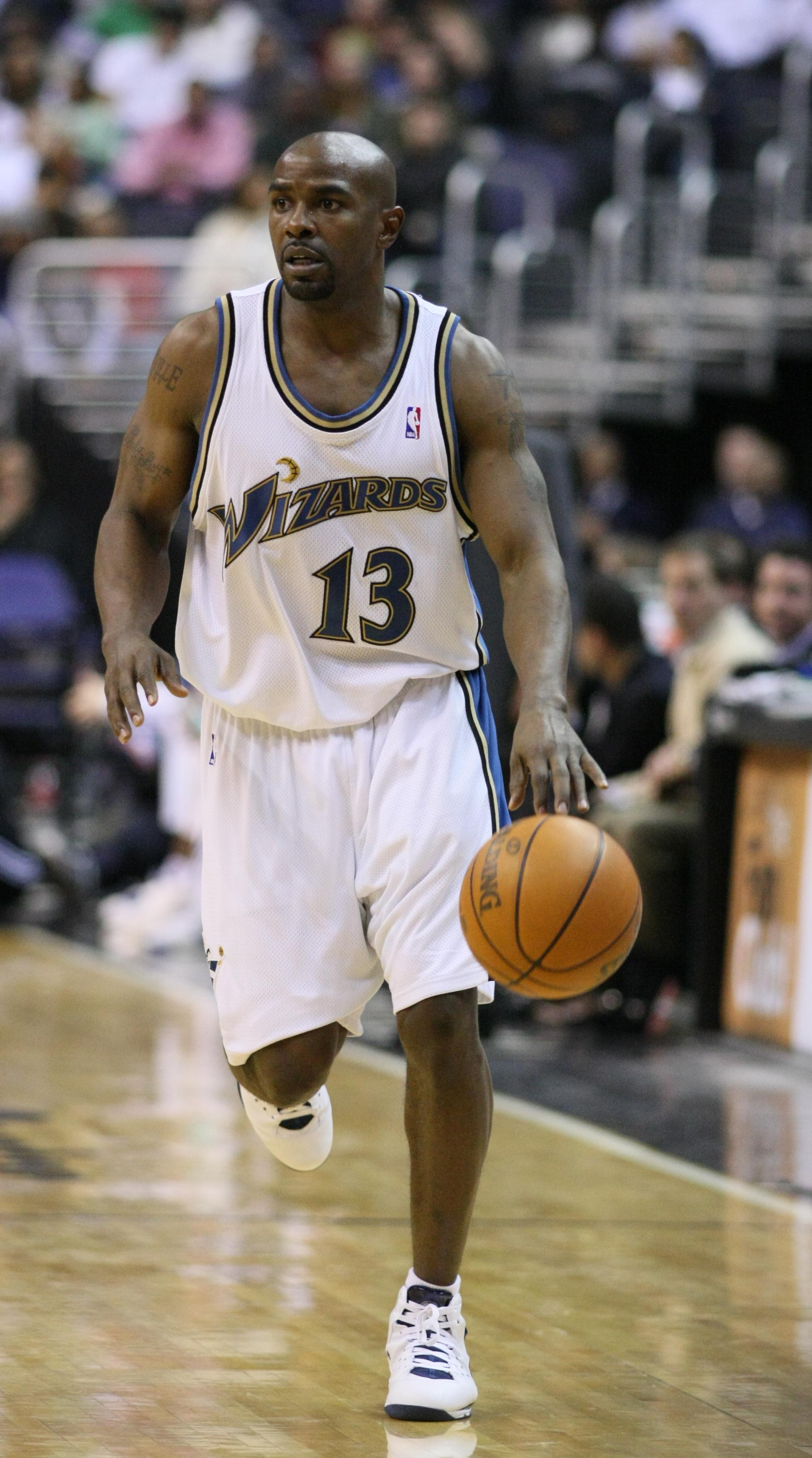
Mike James

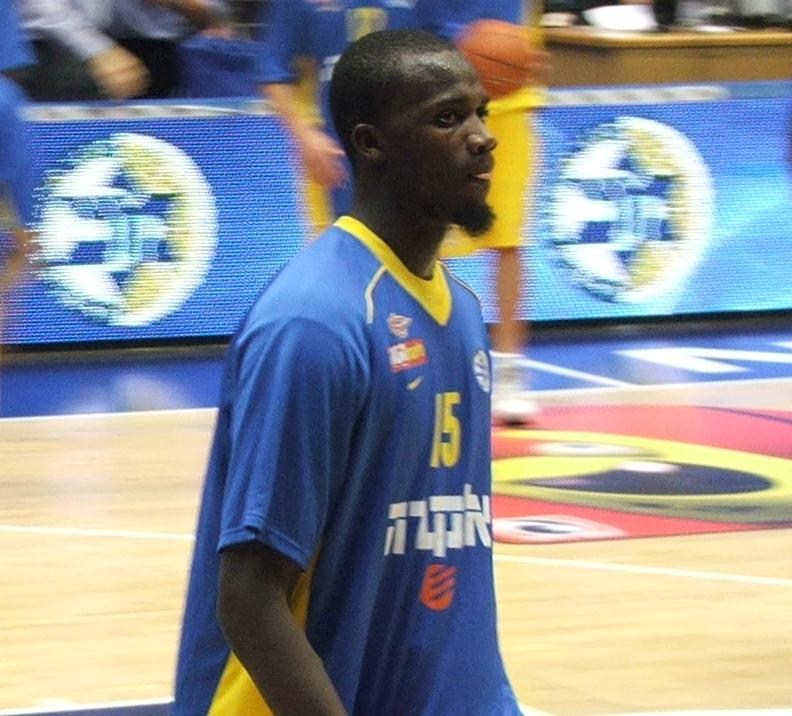
Shawn James

- Mike Basrak – played center and linebacker for NFL's Pittsburgh Steelers
- Joe Beimel – relief pitcher for Pittsburgh Pirates
- Leigh Bodden – former NFL defensive back
- Boyd Brumbaugh – former NFL player and first-round draft pick
- Donn Clendenon (1978) – MLB player for Pittsburgh Pirates, New York Mets; 1969 World Series MVP
- Chuck Cooper – first African-American player to be drafted into the NBA
- Luca Crusifino – retired professional wrestler, played football at Duquesne
- Jayden Da – professional soccer player
- Mickey Davis – former NBA player for Milwaukee Bucks
- Aldo Donelli – player and head coach in NFL; member of United States National Soccer Hall of Fame
- Tavian Dunn-Martin, CEBL point guard
- Al Federoff – Major League Baseball player
- Chip Ganassi – former professional racecar driver; current professional race team owner
- Sihugo Green – NBA player (1957; 1959–1966)
- Korie Hlede – WNBA player
- Mike James – former professional basketball player, Detroit Pistons, Toronto Raptors, Washington Wizards; has won one NBA Championship
- Shawn James – former professional basketball player
- Ray Kemp – professional football player, first African-American to play for Pittsburgh Steelers
- Christian Kuntz – long snapper for the Pittsburgh Steelers
- Stefan Lundberg – professional soccer player for Pittsburgh Riverhounds
- Barry Nelson – former NBA player
- Norm Nixon – professional basketball player for Los Angeles Lakers and Los Angeles Clippers, 2-time NBA champion and 4-time All-Star
- Cumberland Posey – Negro league baseball player, manager, and team owner; Baseball Hall of Famer
- Dave Ricketts – former MLB player
- Dick Ricketts – NBA's first overall pick in annual player draft (1955); also played Major League Baseball
- Art Rooney – Pittsburgh Steelers founder and former owner, member of Pro Football Hall of Fame
- Dan Rooney – Pittsburgh Steelers former president and chairman, member of Pro Football Hall of Fame, former United States Ambassador to Ireland
- Jimmy Smith – former MLB player; won one World Series
- Dwayne Woodruff – defensive back for NFL's Pittsburgh Steelers (1979–1990), won one Super Bowl; founding partner of Woodruff, Flaherty & Fardo law firm (now Flaherty Fardo, LLC); currently judge of Court of Common Pleas in Pittsburgh

=== Politics and law ===
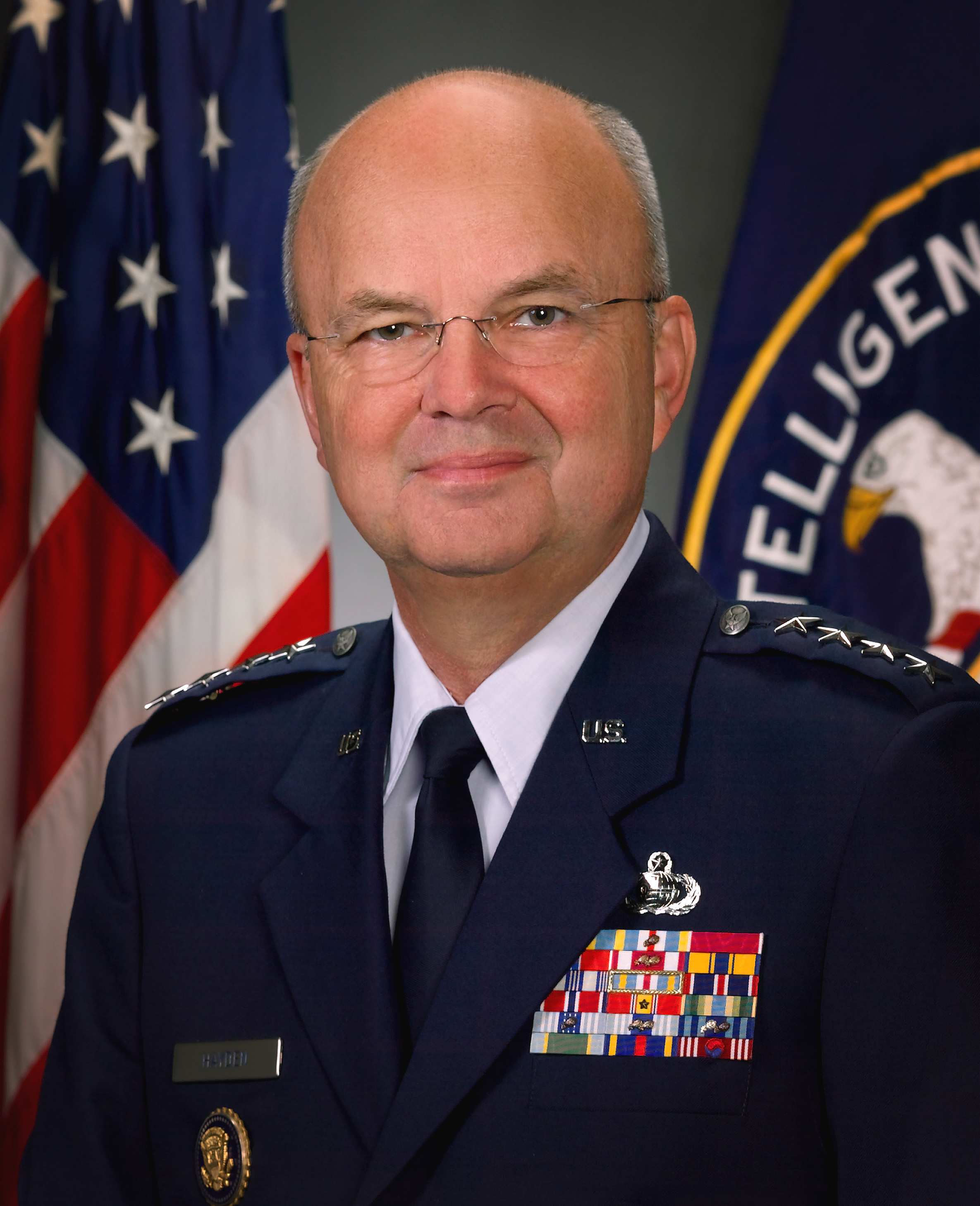
Michael V. Hayden, former director of the CIA

- Donald A. Bailey – politician and lawyer
- Derrick Bell – legal theorist
- Mark Ciavarella – disbarred former Luzerne County judge following the kids for cash scandal
- Anthony Colaizzo – Democratic member of Pennsylvania House of Representatives, 1989–1999
- Father James Cox – Roman Catholic priest, labor activist, and presidential candidate
- Bob Cranmer – county commissioner of Allegheny County, Pennsylvania, 1995–1999; former chairman of Republican Party of Allegheny County
- Henry Ellenbogen – Pennsylvania congressman (1933–1938)
- Gerald Feierstein (M.A. c:a 1975) – diplomat
- Joseph M. Gaydos (1947) – Pennsylvania delegate to U.S. House of Representatives; first Slovak-American elected to Congress
- General Michael V. Hayden (1967) (1969) – retired United States Air Force general; former director of CIA
- Ernest Kline – lieutenant governor of Pennsylvania, 1971–1979; dropped out because of inability to pay
- Catherine Baker Knoll – lieutenant governor of Pennsylvania
- Thomas Patrick Melady (1970) – diplomat and professor at the Institute of World Politics
- Corey O'Connor – mayor of Pittsburgh (2026-present) Allegheny County controller (2022–2026), member of Pittsburgh City Council (2012–2022)
- Guy Reschenthaler – member of the United States House of Representatives for Pennsylvania's 14th congressional district
- Charles Owen Rice – Roman Catholic priest; labor activist
- Karen Garver Santorum – wife of former U.S. Senator Rick Santorum of Pennsylvania
- Thomas E. Scanlon – congressman (1941–1945)
- Bud Shuster – congressman (1972–2001)
- William S. Stickman IV – judge for the United States District Court for the Western District of Pennsylvania
- Terry Van Horne (1968) – member of Pennsylvania House of Representatives, 1981–2000
- Samuel A. Weiss – judge and congressman (1941–1946)
- Khodr Zaarour – professor of international relations; founder of the Muslim American Public Affairs Council

=== Music ===
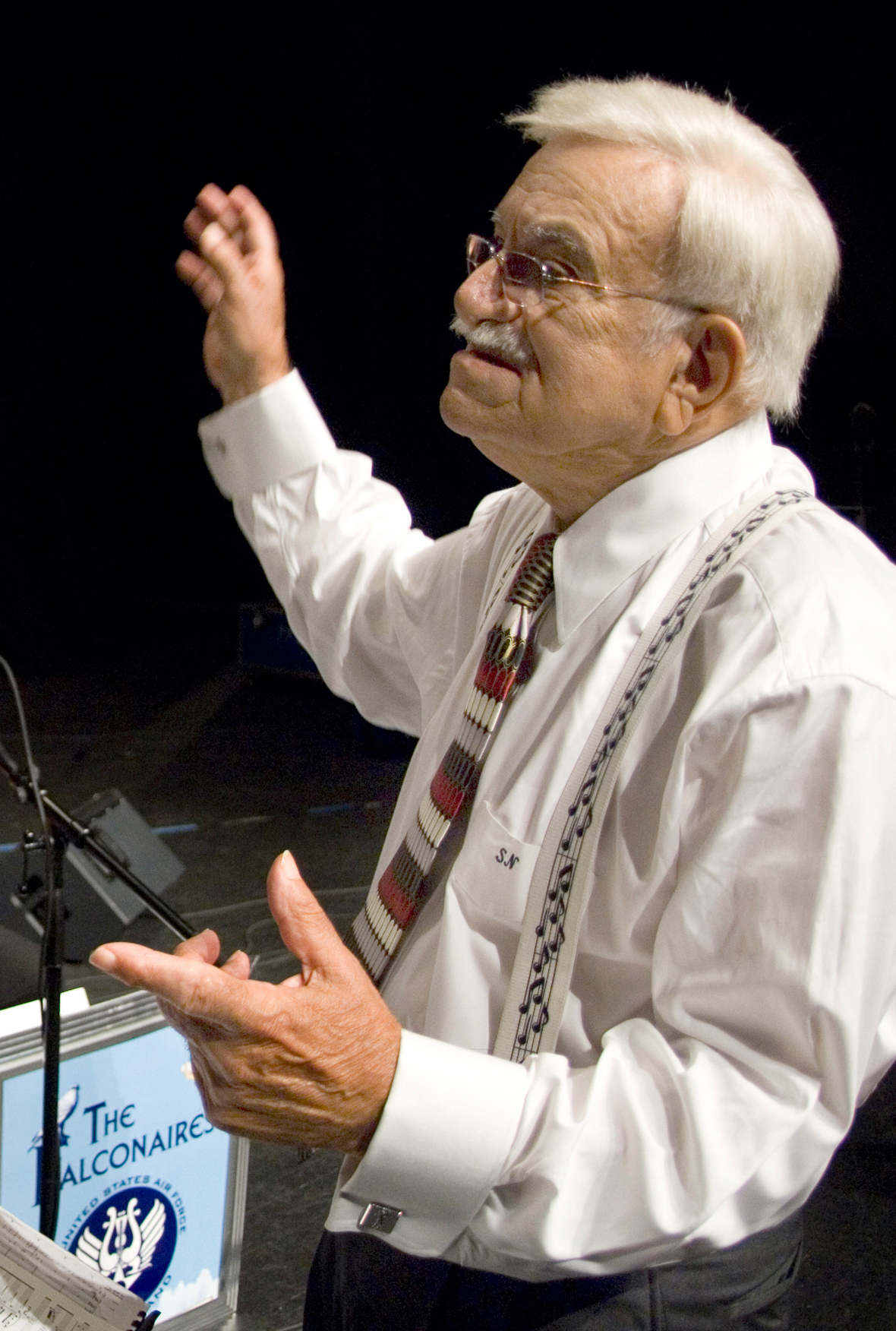
Sammy Nestico, prolific big band composer

- Joseph Carl Breil – first person to compose a score specifically for a motion picture
- Jared DePasquale – composer
- Gene Forrell – composer and conductor
- Henry Mazer – conductor and recording artist for Taipei Philharmonic Orchestra and Chicago Symphony Orchestra
- Sammy Nestico – composer and arranger of big band music
- William Schultz (1950) – president and CEO of Fender Musical Instruments Corporation
- Bobby Vinton (graduated 1956; honorary doctorate in Music in 1978) – "the Polish Prince," recording artist, called most successful love singer of rock era

=== Literature ===
- Ray DiPalma (1966) – poet and visual artist
- Keith Donohue – novelist; director of Communications for National Historical Publications and Records Commission
- Linda O. Johnston – author of mystery and romance novels
- Jerome Loving (MA) – professor of American Literature and Culture at the University of Texas at Austin
- Michael Mann – professor of German literature at the University of California, Berkeley; son of Thomas Mann

=== Other ===
- George Delahunty – physiologist, endocrinologist, and Lilian Welsh Professor of Biology at Goucher College
- Dennis Fitch – member of flight crew of United Airlines Flight 232 that crash-landed in Sioux City, Iowa in 1989, credited with saving 185 of 296 aboard, cited as example of benefits of cockpit resource management
- Constance Flanagan – professor of civil society and community studies
- Mary Ellen Smith Glasgow – nurse and professor
- Miftah Ismail – Pakistan's finance minister
- Jenna Morasca – model
- Monique Samuels – television personality, The Real Housewives of Potomac
- Laurie Trok – graphic artist

== Notable faculty ==
- Francesco Cesareo – Renaissance historian, president of Assumption College (former Dean of the McAnulty College of Liberal Arts)
- Jerry Clack – professor of Classical Languages
- Antony Davies – economist and speaker
- Radhika Gajjala – communications and cultural studies professor
- Samuel John Hazo – author of poetry, fiction, essays and plays (Emeritus McAnulty Distinguished Professor of English)
- James Houlik – tenor saxophonist (professor of Saxophone and chair of Woodwinds)
- Patrick Juola – expert in field of computer linguistics and security, credited with co-creating original biometric word list (professor of Computer Science)
- Maureen Lally-Green – judge on Superior Court of Pennsylvania (adjunct professor at School of Law)
- Conor Lamb – former member of the United States House of Representatives, current distinguished lecturer of law
- Aaron L. Mackler – conservative rabbi (professor of Theology)
- Cardinal Adam Maida – archbishop of Detroit 1990–2009 (former adjunct professor of Theology at School of Law)
- Magali Cornier Michael – feminist literary theorist (associate professor of English and co-director of Women's and Gender Studies program)
- John E. Murray – author of Murray on Contracts; former dean of University of Pittsburgh School of Law and the Villanova University School of Law (University Chancellor and Professor of Law)
- Ron Polansky – philosopher and educator
- James Purdy – scholar of digital rhetoric
- John Walker – concert organist, choirmaster, recording artist (adjunct professor of Organ and Sacred Music (1997–2006))
- Cyril Wecht – forensic pathologist
- Michael Welner – forensic psychiatrist

== Heads of Duquesne University ==
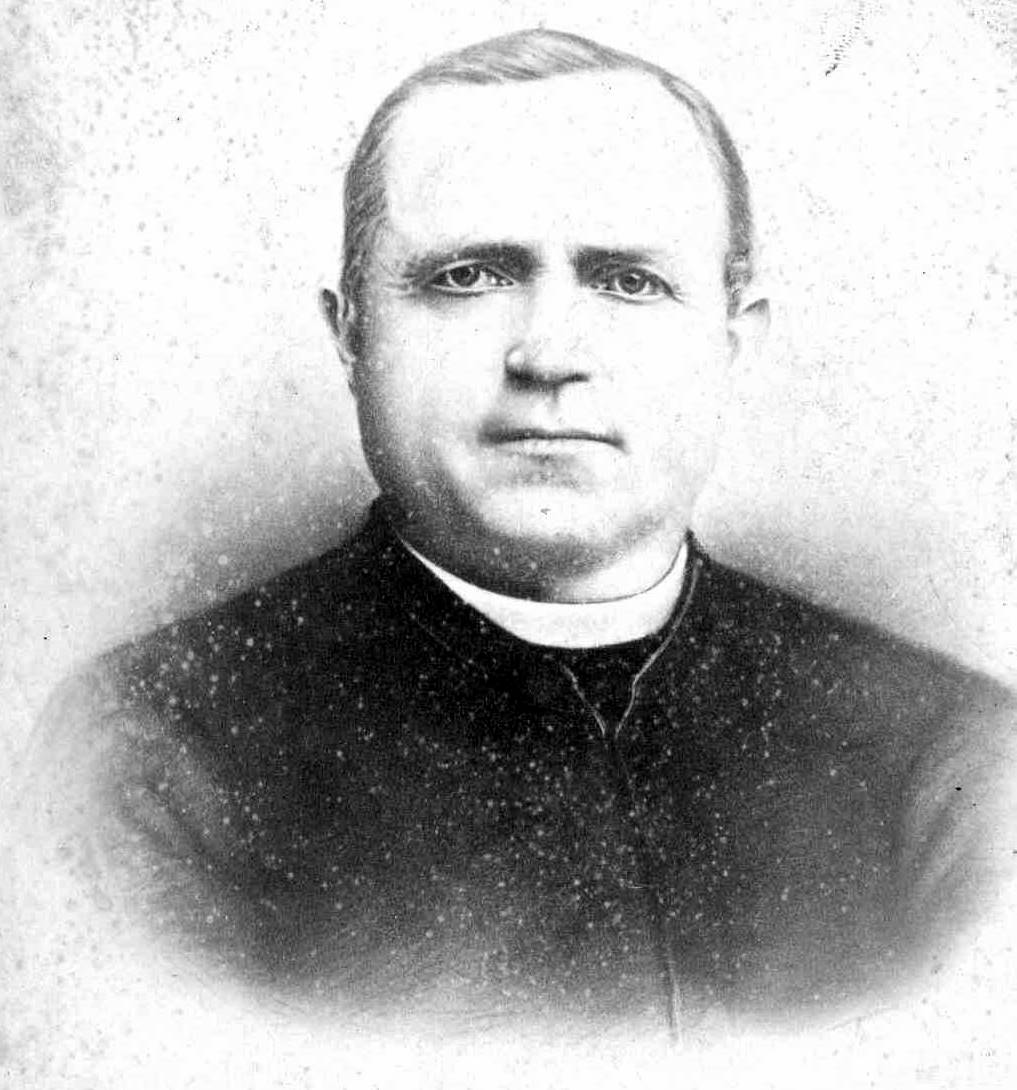
Father Joseph Strub, founder of the Pittsburgh Catholic College

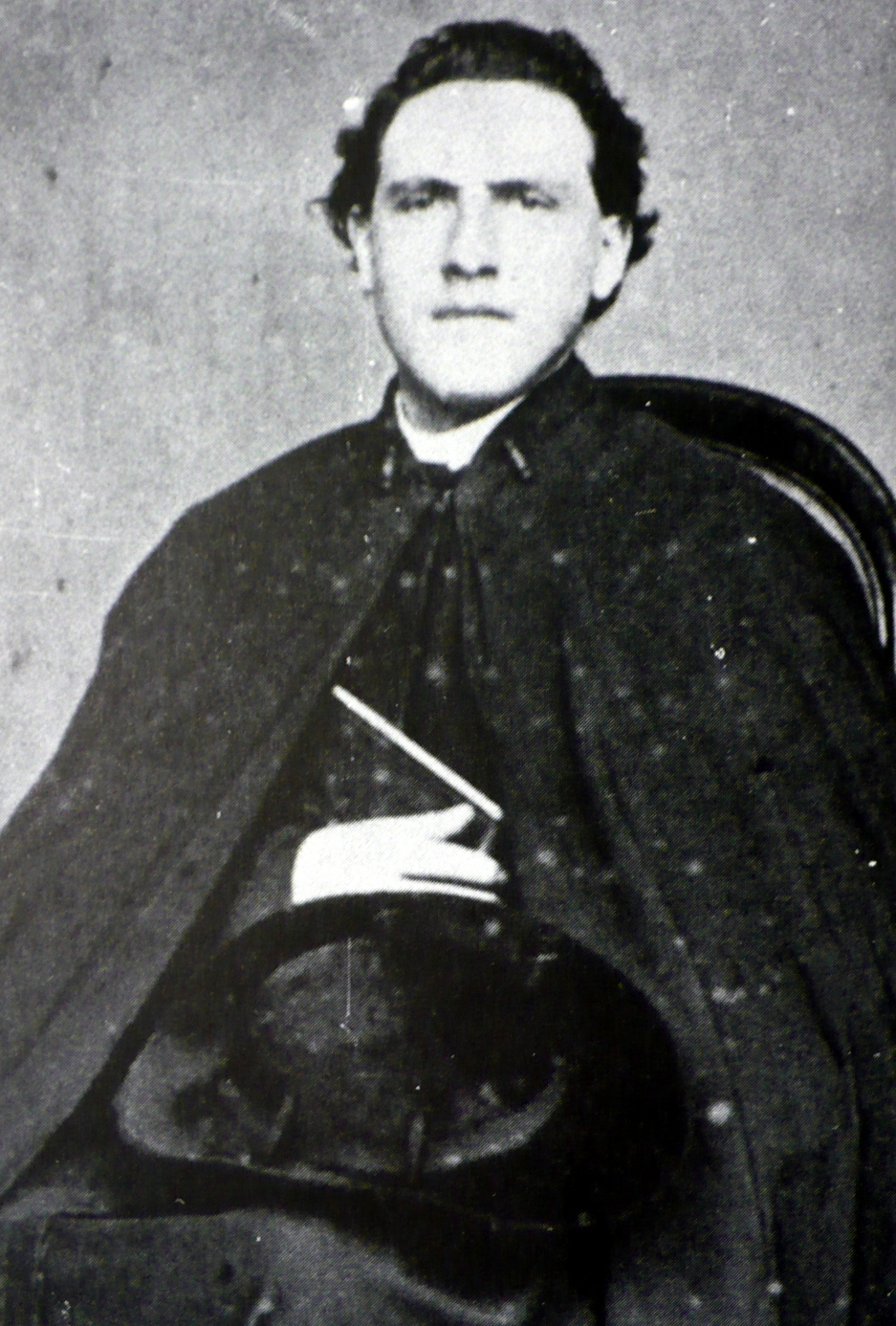
Father William Patrick Power, the first rector of the college

Duquesne University was founded in 1878 as the Pittsburgh Catholic College of the Holy Ghost by a group of Spiritan priests under the leadership of Joseph Strub. The institution was renamed Duquesne University of the Holy Ghost in 1911.

No.	Name	Tenure	Title
1.	William P. Power	1878–1885	Rector of the Pittsburgh Catholic College
2.	John S. Willms	1885–1886	Rector of the Pittsburgh Catholic College
3.	John T. Murphy	1886–1899	President of the Pittsburgh Catholic College
4	Martin A. Hehir	1899–1931	President of the Pittsburgh Catholic College
4	Martin A. Hehir	1899–1931	President of Duquesne University
5.	Jeremiah J. Callahan	1931–1940	President of Duquesne University
6.	Raymond V. Kirk	1940–1946	President of Duquesne University
7.	Francis P. Smith	1946–1950	President of Duquesne University
8.	Vernon F. Gallagher	1950–1959	President of Duquesne University
9.	Henry J. McAnulty	1959–1980	President of Duquesne University
10.	Donald S. Nesti	1980–1988	President of Duquesne University
11.	John E. Murray, Jr.	1988–2001	President of Duquesne University
12.	Charles J. Dougherty	2001–2016	President of Duquesne University
13.	Kenneth G. Gormley	2016–2026	President of Duquesne University
14.	David J. Dausey	2026–present	President of Duquesne University

=== Graphical timeline ===
Heads of Duquesne University

=== References for heads of Duquesne University ===
- "Duquesne's Leaders". Early History. Duquesne University. Archived from the original on May 28, 2007.
