= List of Allegheny College alumni =

This page lists notable alumni and former students, faculty, and administrators of Allegheny College in Meadville, Pennsylvania.

== Alumni ==
=== Academia ===
- John Aldrich – Edmund T. Pratt, Jr. University Professor of Political Science at Duke University, fellow of the American Academy of Arts and Sciences
- Charles Craik – professor of Chemistry at the University of California, San Francisco
- Morris P. Fiorina – Wendt Family Professor of Political Science at Stanford University
- Beth Gylys (1986) – professor at Georgia State University and award-winning poet
- Specs Howard – founder of Specs Howard School of Media Arts
- William C. Jason – longest-serving president of Delaware State University
- Jennifer S. Lawton – Richard Bennett Darnall Professor of Surgery and chief of the Johns Hopkins Division of Cardiac Surgery
- William H. Parker – Professor of Physics at the University of California, Irvine
- Victor Pickard – C. Edwin Baker Professor of Media Policy and Political Economy at the University of Pennsylvania
- Carol Reardon – George Winfree Professor of American History at Pennsylvania State University; winner of the Helen Dortch Longstreet Prize, Victor Gondos Memorial Service Award, William Woods Hassler Award for Excellence in Civil War Education
- Khodr Zaarour – professor of international relations; founder of the Muslim American Public Affairs Council

=== Business ===
- Milton Stewart — oil investor

=== Government ===
- William B. Allison – U.S. senator from Iowa
- David W. Baine – Alabama lawyer and Confederate veteran
- Robert J. Corbett – U.S. representative for Pennsylvania (1939–1941, 1945–1971)
- Aylett R. Cotton – U.S. representative for Iowa (1871–1875)
- Clarence Darrow – lawyer and leading member of the American Civil Liberties Union
- Jon M. Davis – lieutenant general, USMC deputy commandant for aviation
- R. Budd Dwyer – Pennsylvania state treasurer
- John Wilson Farrelly – U.S. representative for Pennsylvania's 22nd congressional district 1847–1849
- Cathi Forbes – Maryland legislator
- Henry Donnel Foster – U.S. representative for Pennsylvania (1843–1847, 1871–1873) and 1860 Pennsylvania Democratic gubernatorial candidate
- W. Scott Hardy – judge of the United States District Court for the Western District of Pennsylvania
- Samuel Hays – U.S. representative for Pennsylvania (1843-1845)
- Daniel Brodhead Heiner – U.S. representative for Pennsylvania (1893–1897)
- Robert F. Kent – Pennsylvania state representative (1947–1956) and Pennsylvania state treasurer (1957–1961)
- Victoria Lipnic – former acting chair of the Equal Employment Opportunity Commission 2017–2019
- Lloyd Lowndes, Jr. – 43rd governor of Maryland (1896–1900); U.S. representative (1873–1875)
- Benjamin F. Martin (1854) – U.S. representative (1877–1881)
- William McKinley – 25th president of the United States
- Francis Harrison Pierpont (1839) – "father of West Virginia," served as governor of Virginia (1865-1868)
- Raymond P. Shafer (1938) – 39th governor of Pennsylvania (1967–1971)
- Thomas Tipton – U.S. senator from Nebraska
- Mike Veon – Pennsylvania state representative (1985–2006)
- Sabra Wilbur Vought (1899) – librarian at the US Department of the Interior
- Rob Wonderling – Pennsylvania state senator (2003–2009)

=== Journalism ===
- Alex Steffen (1990) – environmental journalist
- Ida M. Tarbell (1880) – pioneering investigative journalist, author of The History of the Standard Oil Company, which led to the dissolution of the Standard Oil Company
- Bradley Roland Will (1992) – anarchist and journalist (1970–2006)

=== Literature ===
- Elmer Albert Apple – author of Mr. Chang and Rafferty stories for Detective Story Magazine, nationally syndicated columnist, business journalist
- Valentino Achak Deng (attended) – "Lost Boy" of Darfur; subject of the book What Is the What: The Autobiography of Valentino Achak Deng
- Janette Hill Knox (PhD.) – temperance reformer, suffragist, teacher, author
- Brooke McEldowney – cartoonist, 9 Chickweed Lane
- Barbara Robinson – author, The Best Christmas Pageant Ever (1972) and The Best School Year Ever (1994)
- Chuck Rosenthal – author, Loop's Progress, My Mistress Humanity, Never Let Me Go

=== Performing arts ===
- Ben Burtt – Academy Award-winning sound designer
- Flesh-N-Bone (attended on basketball scholarship)
- Gene Hong – TV writer, actor and producer
- Michele Pawk (attended) – Tony Award-winning actress
- Trent Reznor (attended) – musician (Nine Inch Nails)
- Lloyd Segan – TV and film producer

=== Religion ===
- Robert Appleyard – bishop of Pittsburgh
- Kathy Keller (1972) – Christian theological writer, church founder, wife of Tim Keller
- William Fitzjames Oldham – Methodist Episcopal bishop; founder of Anglo-Chinese School
- Erastus Wentworth (1850) – Methodist Episcopal minister

=== Science ===
- Jennifer S. Lawton – cardiothoracic surgeon
- William H. Parker (1963) – physics professor
- Edward Shanbrom (1947) – pioneering hematologist and medical researcher
- Paul Siple (1932) – Antarctic explorer and the originator of the wind chill factor

=== Sports ===
- Ronnie Anderson (1997) – former National Football League player
- Glenn Beckert – former Major League Baseball player for the Chicago Cubs
- Stan Drayton (1993) – head football coach at Temple University; former National Football League assistant coach; assistant coach for national championship teams at Florida and Ohio State
- Russ McKelvy – former Major League Baseball player
- Babe Parnell – National Football League player
- Jeremy Scott (2003) – Olympic pole vaulter
- Josh Sharpless (2003) – relief pitcher for the Pittsburgh Pirates baseball team
- Nathan T. Smith (2001) – four-time USGA Mid-Amateur Champion, three-time US National Team Member, NCAA runner-up

=== Technology ===
- Marco Arment (2004) – iOS developer and web developer, podcaster, technology writer and former magazine editor

== See also ==
- List of presidents of Allegheny College
