= Braverman =

Braverman is a surname. Notable people with the surname include:

- Adam L. Braverman (born 1975), American lawyer
- Al Braverman (1919–1997), American boxing manager, promoter, and trainer
- Alan N. Braverman (born 1947/8), American media executive
- Alan Braverman (born 1973), American businessman
- Alexander Braverman (born 1974), Israeli mathematician
- Amy Braverman, American statistician
- Arthur Braverman (born 1942), American Japanese translator
- Avishay Braverman (born 1948), Israeli economist
- Bart Braverman (born 1946), American actor
- Blair Braverman (born 1988), American adventurer
- Charles Braverman (born 1944), American filmmaker
- Daniel Braverman (born 1993), American NFL football player
- Elena Braverman, Russian, Israeli, and Canadian mathematician
- Eric R. Braverman (born 1957), American physician
- Harry Braverman (1920–1976), American Marxist economist
- Kate Braverman (1949–2019), American novelist
- Lewis E. Braverman (1929–2019), American endocrinologist
- Mark Braverman (born 1948), American psychologist
- Mark Braverman (mathematician) (born 1984), Israeli mathematician
- Maurice Braverman (1916–2002), American civil rights lawyer
- Miriam Braverman (1920–2002), American librarian
- Sara Braverman (1918–2013), Israeli military operative
- Suella Braverman (born 1980), British politician
- Sylvia Braverman (1918–2013), American artist

== See also ==
- Bye Bye Braverman, 1968 film
- In list of Parenthood characters, fictional Braverman family
