= Willard Gallery =

Contemporary art gallery

The Willard Gallery was a contemporary art gallery operating in New York City from 1940 until 1987. It was founded by Marian Willard Johnson.

== History ==
In 1936, Marian Guthrie Willard had founded the East River Gallery as an art rental gallery at 358 East 57 St. As Willard became "more and more interested in the development of individual artists" the idea of renting became less and less appealing and she officially closed the East River Gallery in 1938 to re-evaluate her direction. Willard spent 1938–1940 in association with J. B. Neumann who was turning to selling old masters to supplement the sale of contemporary art. In 1940, she found a small space next door to Curt Valentin's Bucholtz Gallery at 32 East 57th St. where she opened Willard Gallery.

Marian Willard Johnson wrote of her experience running the gallery:

[Curt Valentin and I] frequently worked together, each showing an aspect of an artist’s work. I showed Alexander Calder’s jewelry while Curt showed his mobiles. We made similar arrangements with the work of Paul Klee, Lyonel Feininger and David Smith. I had been in contact with Mark Tobey and Morris Graves since 1939 and was to launch their work during the early forties ... The forties was not an easy moment in art. If we sold a Tobey for $350.00 there was rejoicing and celebration with the artist, who got a tremendous lift from such a sale. Our rent was low, our salaries lower, but we built on faith. A few devoted collectors and museum curators kept us afloat. The fifties brought much wider public interest and better prices. Some reputations had been established and the Gallery overhead was assured as was the living of many of our artists ... In 1952 the Willard Gallery moved to 23 West 56 St.

In 1942, Willard married Dan Johnson and changed her surname to Willard Johnson, henceforth directing the gallery in partnership with her husband. In 1962 the gallery moved to its final location at 29 East 72 St. After Dan and Marian Johnson retired in 1970 their daughter, Miani Johnson, took directorship of the gallery until, again facing relocation, she closed it in 1987. Willard Gallery was a member of the Art Dealer’s Association of America.

== Exhibition history by artist last name ==
Akiba February 14 – 26, 1938

Albers, Anni May 5 – 24, 1941

Baxter, John March 3 – 27, 1954

Bayer, Herbert March 9 – 27, 1943

Baynard, Ed February 9 – March 13, 1971; September 28 – October 23, 1971; October 29 – November 26, 1977

Bigelow, Larry May 1962

Braverman, Sylvia March 1 – 26, 1966; November 4 – 29, 1969; September 20 – October 25, 1975

Buljetta, Ellen November 20 - December 22, 1983

Bunuel, Juan Luis October 5 – 30, 1965; October 7 – November 11, 1969

Byars, James October 3 – 28, 1961

Calder, Alexander Jewelry: December 8 – 25, 1940 Jewelry: December 8 – 25, 1941 Drawings: December 1 – 24, 1942

Cannon, Kevin October 30 – November 27, 1982

Charlton, Gene February 2 – 27, 1954

Conolly, Thurloe April 24 – May 19, 1951 March 3 – 28, 1953

Dehner, Dorothy May 3 – 28, 1955 May 7 – 31, 1957 1959 November 1–26, 1960 February 5 – March 2, 1963 November 15 – December 10, 1966 April 21–23, 1970 February 2 – March 3, 1973

Duff, John March 15 – April 17, 1975 March 6 – April 7, 1976 February 5 – March 3, 1977 November 21 – December 23, 1978

English, Jane Photographs from Tao Te Ching: November 28 – December 30, 1972

Essman, Manuel March 31 – April 12, 1941

Feininger, Lyonel December 7 – 21, 1936 March 1941 Fantasy in Feininger: January 26 – February 13, 1943 Figures: January 29 – February 23, 1946 February 1 – March 3, 1956 Gables: November 27 – December 29, 1956 March 6 – April 12, 1958 November 4 – December 6, 1958 February 2 – 27, 1960 Paris-New York: March 1 – 31, 1961 April 14 – May 14, 1964

Ferren, John March 17 – April 4, 1942

Fine, Perle March 1945

Forbes, Donald January 27 – February 14, 1942 1952

Foulkes, Llyn February 11 – March 15, 1975

Gallatin, Eugene April 15 – May 3, 1941

Gatch, Lee February 15 – March 6, 1943

Gatewood, Maud October 31 – November 25, 1972

Goldberg, Glenn November 26 – December 21, 1985 April 16 – May 29, 1987

Graves, Morris November 3 – 28, 1942 January 11 – February 5, 1944 January 30 – February 24, 1945 March 1948, Ritual Vessels November 9 – December 4, 1948 November 17 – December 12, 1953 March 30 – April 24, 1954 November 1 – 26, 1955 December 1 – 31, 1959 April 20 – May 22, 1971 May 11 – June 12, 1976 April 22 – May 24, 1978

Grippe, Peter November 7 – December 2, 1944 October – November 1945 October 8 – November 2, 1946 February 3 – 28, 1948 Gaitonde, VS May 4 – 29, 1965

Haubensak, Pierre January 6 – February 5, 1976 May 7, June 10, 1977

Hasegawa, Sabro April 23 – May 4, 1957

Hayes, David February 1 – 25, 1961 October 27 – November 27, 1964 October 11 – November 12, 1966 February 25 – March 29, 1969 January 5 – February 6, 1971

Hayter, Stanley May 27 – June 7, 1941 May 3 – 22, 1943

Helion, Jean March 21 – April 22, 1967

Hon Chi-Fun January 6 – February 7, 1970

Hood, Dorothy October 10 – November 4, 1950 Hughes, Toni January 13 – 25, 1941

Humphrey, Ralph April 8 – May 7, 1980 April 3 – May 8, 1982

Inokuma, Genichiro April 3 – 28, 1956 February 26 – March 23, 1957 October 7 – November 1, 1958 October 4 – 29, 1960 October 30 – November 24, 1962 September 29 – October 24, 1964 February 14 – March 18, 1967 October 8 – November 9, 1968 October 13 – November 14, 1970 October 3 – 28, 1972

Johnson, Ray April 6 – May 1, 1965 April 26 – May 21, 1966 April 25 – May 27, 1967

Kenney, Leo April 16 – May 18, 1968

Klee, Paul 1939 October 9 – November 2, 1940

Knee, Gina April 7 – May 2, 1942 November 9 – December 4, 1943 March 29 – April 23, 1949 May 3 – 28, 1955

Korman, Harriet November 20 – January 22, 1976 January 5 – 30, 1980

Koenig, John Franklin March 12 – April 6, 1963 February 1 – 27, 1965

Kolar, Jiri February 2 – March 1, 1970

Ladda, Justen September 5 – October 12, 1985

Lane, Lois September 24 – October 27, 1977 Drawings: January 27 – February 22, 1979 November 5– 29, 1980 February 5 – March 16, 1983 March 7 – April 13, 1985 March 12 – April 11, 1987

Ledoux, Barry March 9 – 31, 1982 January 7 – February 1, 1986

Lewis, Norman March 1 – 26, 1949 March 21 – April 15, 1950 November 6 – December 1, 1951 November 3 – 29, 1952 October 5 – 30, 1954 February 1957 November 28 – December 30, 1961

Lippold, Richard 1946 1947 May 1948 Full Moon: March 1950 February 5 – March 1, 1952 February 1962 January 3 – February 3, 1968 April 17 – May 12, 1973

Lobe, Robert March 8 – April 2, 1980 December 1 – 23, 1981 March 13 – April 5, 1986 January 7 – 31, 1987

Lockwood, Douglas April 26 – March 21, 1949 April 27 – May 15, 1954

Luchs, Michael and Chatelain, James October 28 – November 18, 1978

MacIver, Loren 1936 March 29 – April 16, 1938

Marin, John March 2 – April 3, 1965

Martinelli, Ezio May 1946 April 29 – May 24, 1947 April 29 – May 24, 1952 Sculpture: March 8 – April 2, 1955 May 1 – 26, 1956 March 26 – April 20, 1957 April 15 – May 10, 1958 November 3 – 28, 1959 February 11 – March 7, 1964 February 1 – 26, 1966

Masson, Andre February 17 – March 14, 1942

McCracken, Philip April 5 – 30, 1960 January 4 – 29, 1965 February 7 – March 9, 1968 February 10 – March 14, 1970 Molla January 5 – 31, 1948

Mullican, Lee February 1 – 27, 1950 March 9 – 29, 1952 October 20 – November 14, 1953 March 3 – 28, 1959 April 4 – 29, 1961 January 10 – February 11, 1967

Munakata, Shiko December 2 – 27, 1952 March 31 – April 25, 1959

Nivola, Constantino March 13 – April 14, 1973

Oakes, Maud May 2 – 27, 1944

O’Hanlon, Richard May 5 – 30, 1953 April 9 – May 4, 1963

Ornstein, Judith Drawings: November 29 – December 24, 1977 April 21 – May 17, 1979

Peake, Channing May 7 – June 1, 1963

Peterson, Robert January 4 – February 5, 1972

Pettet, William February 6 – March 10, 1973 March 19 – April 20, 1974 October 28 – November 20, 1975

Pousette-Dart, Richard October 12 – November 6, 1943 January 3 – 27, 1945 December 3 – 28, 1946

Price, C.S. December 1949

Price, Ken November 19 – December 21, 1974 December 1 – 22, 1979 February 6 – March 3, 1982 October 17 – November 23, 1985 November 4 – December 2, 1986

Rahon, Alice December 7 – 31, 1948 1951 October 4 – 29, 1955

Ray, Rudolf October 7 – November 1, 1947 October 4 – 29, 1949 January 2 – 31, 1952 April 5 – 30, 1955

Reichel, Hans April 5 – 16, 1938 March 26 – 31, 1946

Rosenborg, Ralph February 17 – March 8, 1941 November 3, 1941

Rossiter, Alison December 6 – 24, 1986

Rothenberg, Susan April 10 – May 8, 1976 April 2 – May 5, 1977 Hand-colored lithographs: November 29 – December 24, 1977 March 24 – April 19, 1979 Five Heads: April 11 – May 16, 1981 March 19 – April 23, 1983

Sato, Tadashi January 6 – February 1, 1958 January 6 – 31, 1959 January 3 – 28, 1961 January 7 – February 1, 1969

Schanker, Louis March 7 – April 1, 1944 April 17 – May 5, 1945 February 26 – March 23, 1946 November 5 – 30, 1946 October 12 – November 6, 1948 January 3 – 28, 1950

Scholl, John November 28 – December 30, 1967

Schwartz, Barbara September 25 – October 12, 1976 March 18 – April 20, 1978 November 3 – 28, 1979 May 1981

Seitz, William 1949 January 30 – February 24, 1951 February 3 – 28, 1953

Seliger, Charles June 2 – 27, 1951 January 6 – 31, 1953 February 8 – March 5, 1955 September 17 – October 12, 1957 April 28 – May 23, 1959 May 2 – 27, 1961 November 27 – December 29, 1962 March 28 – April 23, 1966 March 12 – April 13, 1968

Shea, Judith June 3 – July 2, 1980 October 31 – November 28, 1981 April 27 – May 21, 1983 October 2 – November 1, 1986

Silverman, Martin February 8 – March 8, 1986

Smith, Charles January 27 – February 8, 1941 February 8 – March 4, 1944

Smith, David January 19 – February 5, 1938 March 25 – April 15, 1940 November 4 – 24, 1940 April 6 – May 1, 1943 January 2 – 26, 1946 April 1 – 26, 1947 April 18 – May 13, 1950 March 27 – April 21, 1951 April 1 – 26, 1952 December 15 – 30, 1953 January 5 – 30, 1954 March 6 – 31, 1956

Smith, Sibley March 27 – 14, 1945 May 11 – June 5, 1948 November 7 – 25, 1950 May 2 – 28, 1955

Stangle, Jack November 12 – December 7, 1968

Stearns, Thomas March 10 – April 11, 1964

Stevens, William Henry November 24, 1941

Sullivan, Jim February 11 – March 16, 1978

Sultan, Donald February 24 – March 22, 1979 October 4 – 30, 1980

Tawney, Lenore September 26 – October 21, 1967 March 17 – April 18, 1970 September 17 – October 12, 1974 Thorne, Joan February 2 – March 5, 1980 October 2 – 27, 1982

Tobey, Mark April 4 – 29, 1944 November 13 – December 8, 1945 November 4 – 29, 1947 November 1 – 26, 1949 November 28 – December 30, 1950 October 9 – November 3, 1951 April 1 – May 2, 1953 November 3 – 27, 1954 Sumi Paintings, November 12 – December 7. 1957 September 25 – October 20, 1962 November 2 – December 4, 1965 October 24 – November 25, 1967 October 26 – November 27, 1971 April 23 – May 2, 1974 Selection from the collection of Arthur Dahl: October 15 – November 16, 1974

Treiman, Joyce March 1 – 26, 1960

Varda, Jean April 25 – May 10, 1936 May 5 – 24, 1941

Vieira Da Silva, Maria Helena April 8 – 27, 1946

Vital, Not February 2 – 27, 1985 Wardy, Frederick January 5 – February 9, 1973 April 19 – May 24, 1975 March 3 – 31, 1977 January 6 – 25, 1979 January 3 – 28, 1980

Watts, Todd September 30 – October 26, 1978

Westerlund, Mia February 12 – March 16, 1978 November 22 – December 23, 1975

Wilson, Ann The Riderless Boat: February 8 – March 11, 1972

Wizon, Tod December 2 – 20, 1980 May 11 – June 16, 1982

Yeats, Jack B March 6 – 31, 1962

Youngblood, Daisy October 6 – 31, 1979 March 7 – April 4, 1981

Zion, Ben November 1 – 15, 1937

== Group/theme shows ==
French-Canadian Primitives: November 30 – December 24, 1937

Art and Commerce: 1942

American Sculpture of Our Time: January 5 – 23, 1943

7 Years: Retrospective Exhibition: December 6 – 13, 1943

Atelier 17: May 15 – June 2, 1945

American Folk Art: September 28 – October 17, 1953; November 29 – December 31, 1955; October 15 – November 9, 1957; October 6 – 31, 1959; November 1 – 25, 1961

Japanese Screens: December 1, 1954 – January 8, 1955; October 30 – November 24, 1956; December 1 – 31, 1960

A Group of Exceptional Drawings: January 3 – 28, 1956

Salute to Modern Art, U.S.A: 1956

Sculpture, Various Times and Cultures: January 3 – 26, 1957

Indian Miniatures: 1957

Heroic Encounter: February 4 – March 1, 1958

CORE Auction: 1961

American Folk Art Stony Point Folk Art Gallery January 14 – February 15, 1964 January 7 – 31, 1965

Decoys: December 1 – 21, 1971

Introductions 1936–1948: January 3 – 27, 1962

Dynamics of Black and White: April 3 – 28, 1962

Opening show at 29 E 72: December 1963

Black, White, and Color: January 4 – 29, 1966

Willard Gallery 30th Anniversary: December 13 – January 7, 1967

Prints from Czechoslovakia: November 17 – December 19, 1970

Art for Peace: September 19 – 26, 1970

Intimate Selections of the American Spirit: March 16 – April 17, 1971

Dimensions: March 21 – April 15, 1972

Spring: April 25 – May 27, 1972

William Pettet, Fred Wardy, Randy Hardy, James Reineking: May 15 – June 16, 1973

Contemporary Drawings: December 4 – 29, 1973

New Talent Festival: June 4 – 15, 1974

Selections: February 7 – March 4, 1976

Abstract Images: January 4 – February 3, 1977

Jeffrey Lew, Joan Thorne, Robert Lobe, Michel Tetherow: May 19 – June 21, 1979

Whiter Black Drawings: December 1 – 23, 1982

Selected Drawings by Eleven Artists: September 14 – October 6, 1984

Willard Gallery 50th Anniversary

Part 1: April 10 – May 10, 1986

Part 2: May 15 – June 27, 1986

Drawings: December 6 – 24, 1986

Prints: February 5 – March 7, 1987
