= Beaver Falls, Pennsylvania =

City in Pennsylvania, US

- City
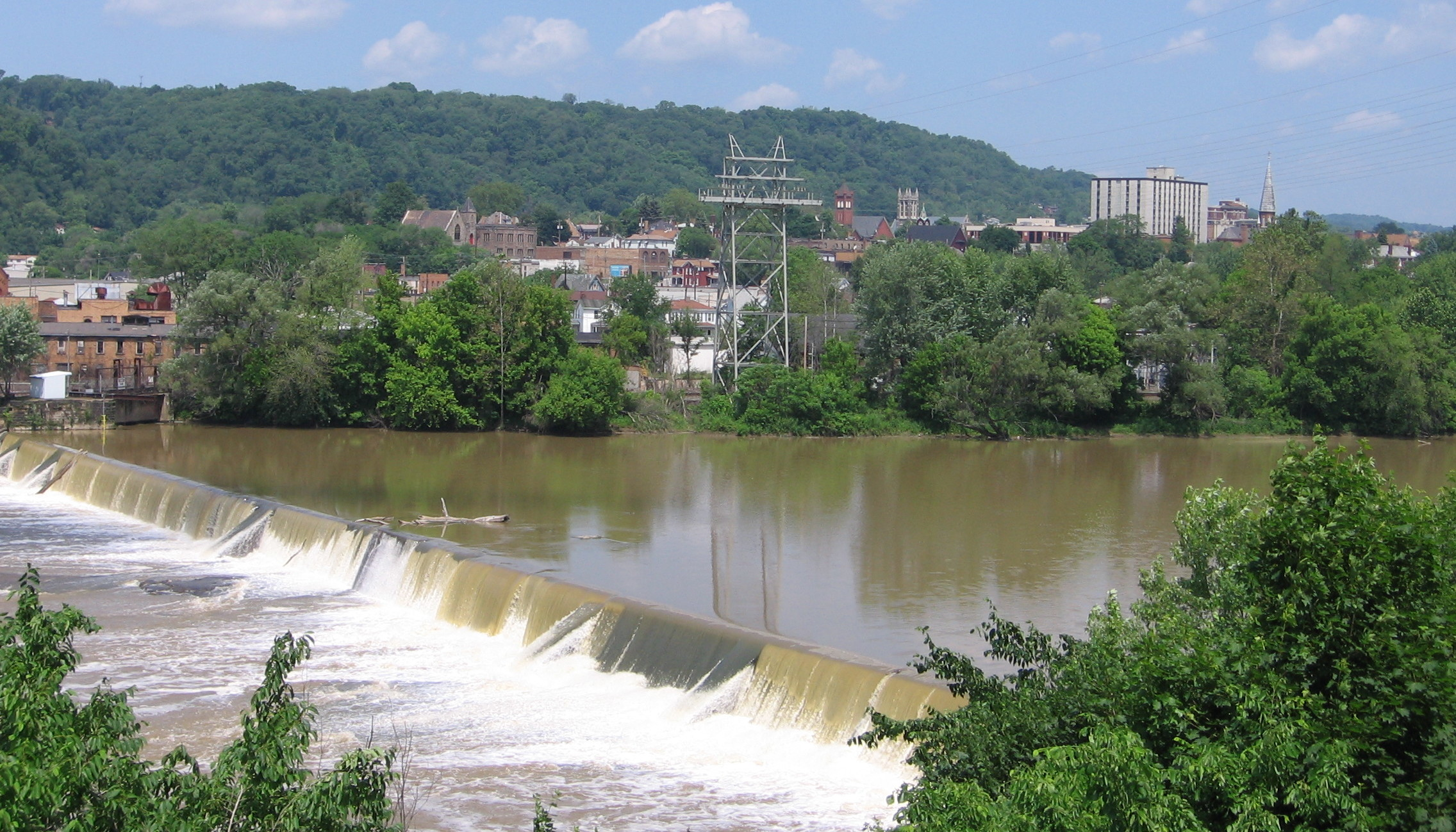
- View of Beaver Falls from across the Beaver River.

- Seal Logo
- Nicknames: BF, Birthplace of College Basketball
- Interactive map of Beaver Falls, Pennsylvania
- Location within Pennsylvania Location within the United States
- Coordinates: 40°45′32″N 80°19′11″W
- Country: United States
- State: Pennsylvania
- County: Beaver
- Incorporated: November 9, 1868 (borough); December 3, 1928 (city)

Government
  - Type: Home rule charter
  - Mayor: Kenya Johns
  - City manager: Charles Jones Jr.

Area
  - Total: 2.36 sq mi (6.11 km^{2})
  - Land: 2.14 sq mi (5.53 km^{2})
  - Water: 0.22 sq mi (0.58 km^{2})

Population (2020)
  - Total: 9,005
  - Density: 4,216.9/sq mi (1,628.15/km^{2})
- Time zone: UTC−5 (EST)
  - Summer (DST): UTC−4 (EDT)
- ZIP Code: 15010
- FIPS code: 42-04792
- Website: beaverfallspa.org

Beaver Falls is a city in Beaver County, Pennsylvania, United States. The population was 9,005 at the 2020 census. The city lies along the Beaver River 6 miles (9.7 km) north of its confluence with the Ohio River. It is 31 miles (50 km) northwest of Pittsburgh and is part of the Pittsburgh metropolitan area.

== History ==
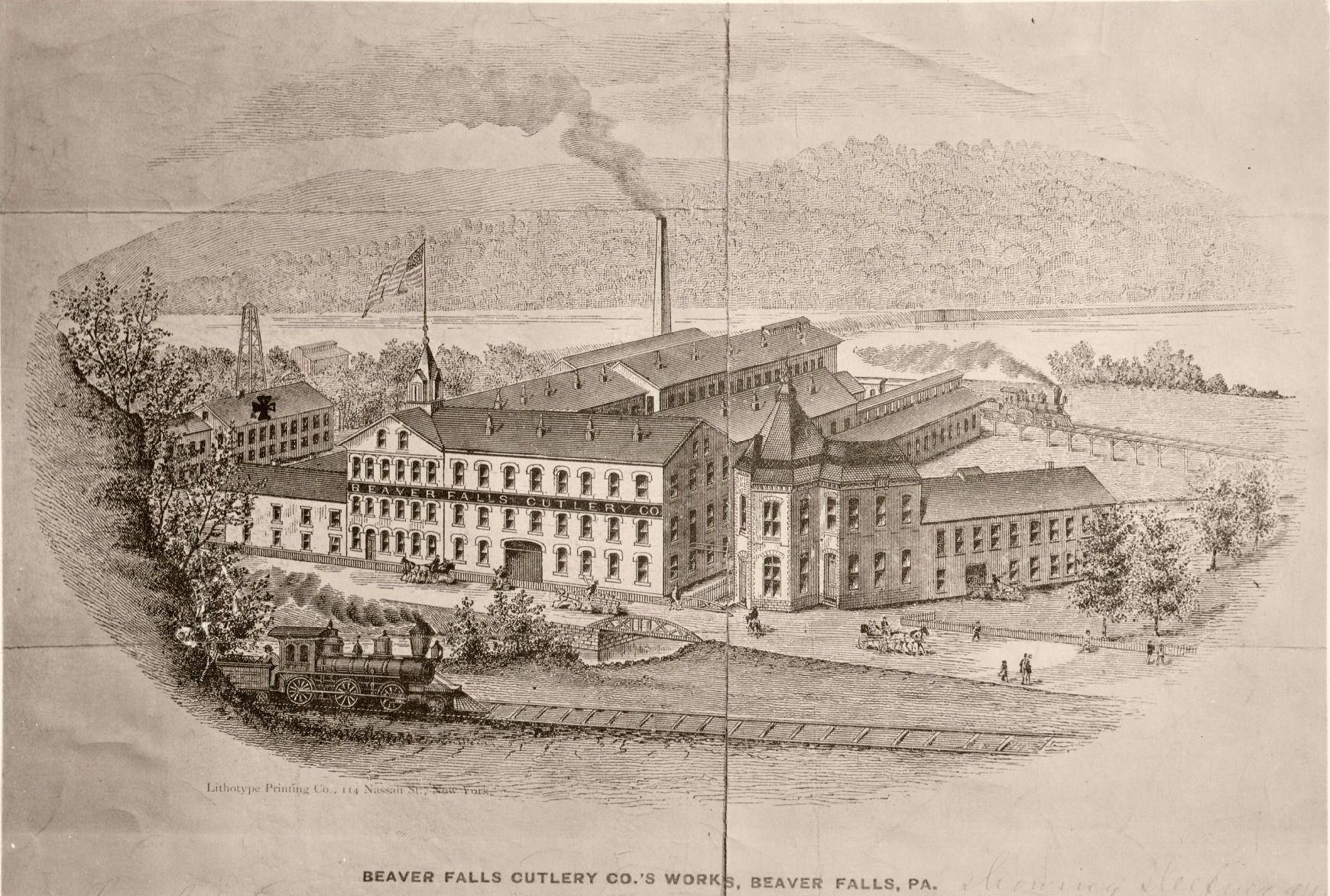
Beaver Falls Cutlery Works (1867)

The area of present-day Beaver Falls was first mentioned in 1770 in the journals of David Zeisberger, a Moravian Church missionary who eventually settled in present-day Lawrence County. A Lenape chief named Pakanke took Zeisberger to the valley surrounding the Beaver River, where the Lenape owned a large tract of open land which Zeisberger was given access to. In April 1770, Zeisberger and his followers set out in 16 canoes down the Allegheny and Ohio rivers, reaching the mouth of the Beaver three days later. They made their way up to what was called the “Falls of the Beaver," where they encamped. The town originally formed around the middle falls area was named Brighton after Brighton, England, which was the hometown of the area's surveyors.

Despite early promise through the canal business on the falls, the town fell behind neighboring New Brighton after repeated poor economic periods. The earlier proprietors sold the land to the Harmony Society in 1859. The Harmonists immediately brought in surveyors to re-plan Brighton, laying out a town twice the size of the original, paving several main streets with brick and officially changing the name of the community to Beaver Falls. The rapid revitalization of the community allowed it to gain borough status on November 9, 1868. In the 1870s, Beaver Falls had a Chinatown and had up to 225 Chinese residents, brought in to work at Beaver Falls Cutlery Company moved in to the borough by the Harmonists.

In 1932, the Borough of College Hill merged with the city, nearly doubling its size.

On May 31, 1985, an F3 tornado hit just north of the city as it went across northern portions of Beaver County, as part of the 1985 United States–Canada tornado outbreak.

The population declined nearly 50% between 1940 and 2000, which is attributed mostly to its central location in the Rust Belt.

== Geography ==
=== Climate ===
Beaver Falls experiences a humid continental climate with cold winters and hot summers. The hottest month is July with a mean temperature of 72.1 °F (22.3 °C) and the coldest month is January with a mean temperature of 27.6 °F (−2.4 °C).

Climate data for Beaver Falls, Pennsylvania (Beaver Falls 1NE) 1991–2020 normals (records 2011–present)
Month	Jan	Feb	Mar	Apr	May	Jun	Jul	Aug	Sep	Oct	Nov	Dec	Year
Record high °F (°C)	67 (19)	76 (24)	77 (25)	86 (30)	94 (34)	92 (33)	97 (36)	92 (33)	95 (35)	89 (32)	82 (28)	69 (21)	97 (36)
Mean daily maximum °F (°C)	35.9 (2.2)	39.0 (3.9)	48.3 (9.1)	61.6 (16.4)	71.5 (21.9)	78.9 (26.1)	83.1 (28.4)	82.2 (27.9)	75.6 (24.2)	63.8 (17.7)	51.0 (10.6)	40.3 (4.6)	60.9 (16.1)
Daily mean °F (°C)	27.6 (−2.4)	29.1 (−1.6)	37.6 (3.1)	49.1 (9.5)	59.7 (15.4)	67.7 (19.8)	72.1 (22.3)	70.9 (21.6)	64.3 (17.9)	52.8 (11.6)	41.3 (5.2)	32.4 (0.2)	50.4 (10.2)
Mean daily minimum °F (°C)	19.2 (−7.1)	19.1 (−7.2)	26.8 (−2.9)	36.6 (2.6)	47.8 (8.8)	56.4 (13.6)	61.1 (16.2)	59.5 (15.3)	52.9 (11.6)	41.8 (5.4)	31.5 (−0.3)	24.5 (−4.2)	39.8 (4.3)
Record low °F (°C)	−9 (−23)	−12 (−24)	−1 (−18)	18 (−8)	28 (−2)	40 (4)	49 (9)	49 (9)	36 (2)	29 (−2)	13 (−11)	0 (−18)	−12 (−24)
Average precipitation inches (mm)	3.14 (80)	2.40 (61)	3.07 (78)	3.65 (93)	3.84 (98)	4.26 (108)	4.82 (122)	3.50 (89)	3.62 (92)	3.06 (78)	2.95 (75)	3.01 (76)	40.32 (1,024)
Average precipitation days (≥ 0.01 in)	14	11	12	14	14	12	11	10	10	12	12	13	144
Source: NOAA

== Demographics ==
Historical population
Census	Pop.	Note	%±
1870	3,112		—
1880	5,104		64.0%
1890	9,735		90.7%
1900	10,054		3.3%
1910	12,191		21.3%
1920	12,802		5.0%
1930	17,147		33.9%
1940	17,098		−0.3%
1950	17,375		1.6%
1960	16,240		−6.5%
1970	14,635		−9.9%
1980	12,525		−14.4%
1990	10,687		−14.7%
2000	9,920		−7.2%
2010	8,987		−9.4%
2020	9,005		0.2%
U.S. Decennial Census

=== 2020 census ===
As of the 2020 census, Beaver Falls had a population of 9,005. The median age was 35.5 years. 21.5% of residents were under the age of 18 and 16.2% of residents were 65 years of age or older. For every 100 females there were 95.8 males, and for every 100 females age 18 and over there were 92.1 males age 18 and over.

As of the 2020 census, 100.0% of residents lived in urban areas, while 0.0% lived in rural areas.

As of the 2020 census, there were 3,407 households in Beaver Falls, of which 27.1% had children under the age of 18 living in them. Of all households, 28.0% were married-couple households, 23.8% were households with a male householder and no spouse or partner present, and 39.9% were households with a female householder and no spouse or partner present. About 38.1% of all households were made up of individuals and 15.0% had someone living alone who was 65 years of age or older.

As of the 2020 census, there were 3,991 housing units, of which 14.6% were vacant. The homeowner vacancy rate was 3.1% and the rental vacancy rate was 10.3%.

Racial composition as of the 2020 census
Race	Number	Percent
White	6,023	66.9%
Black or African American	1,899	21.1%
American Indian and Alaska Native	32	0.4%
Asian	78	0.9%
Native Hawaiian and Other Pacific Islander	5	0.1%
Some other race	168	1.9%
Two or more races	800	8.9%
Hispanic or Latino (of any race)	215	2.4%

=== 2000 census ===
As of the 2000 census, there were 9,920 people, 3,798 households, and 2,259 families residing in the city. The population density was 4,681.6 inhabitants per square mile (1,807.6/km^{2}). There were 4,380 housing units at an average density of 2,067.1 per square mile (798.1/km^{2}). The racial makeup of the city was 78.82% White, 17.53% African American, 0.13% Native American, 0.62% Asian, 0.02% Pacific Islander, 0.50% from other races, and 2.37% from two or more races. Hispanic or Latino of any race were 1.06% of the population.

== Government ==
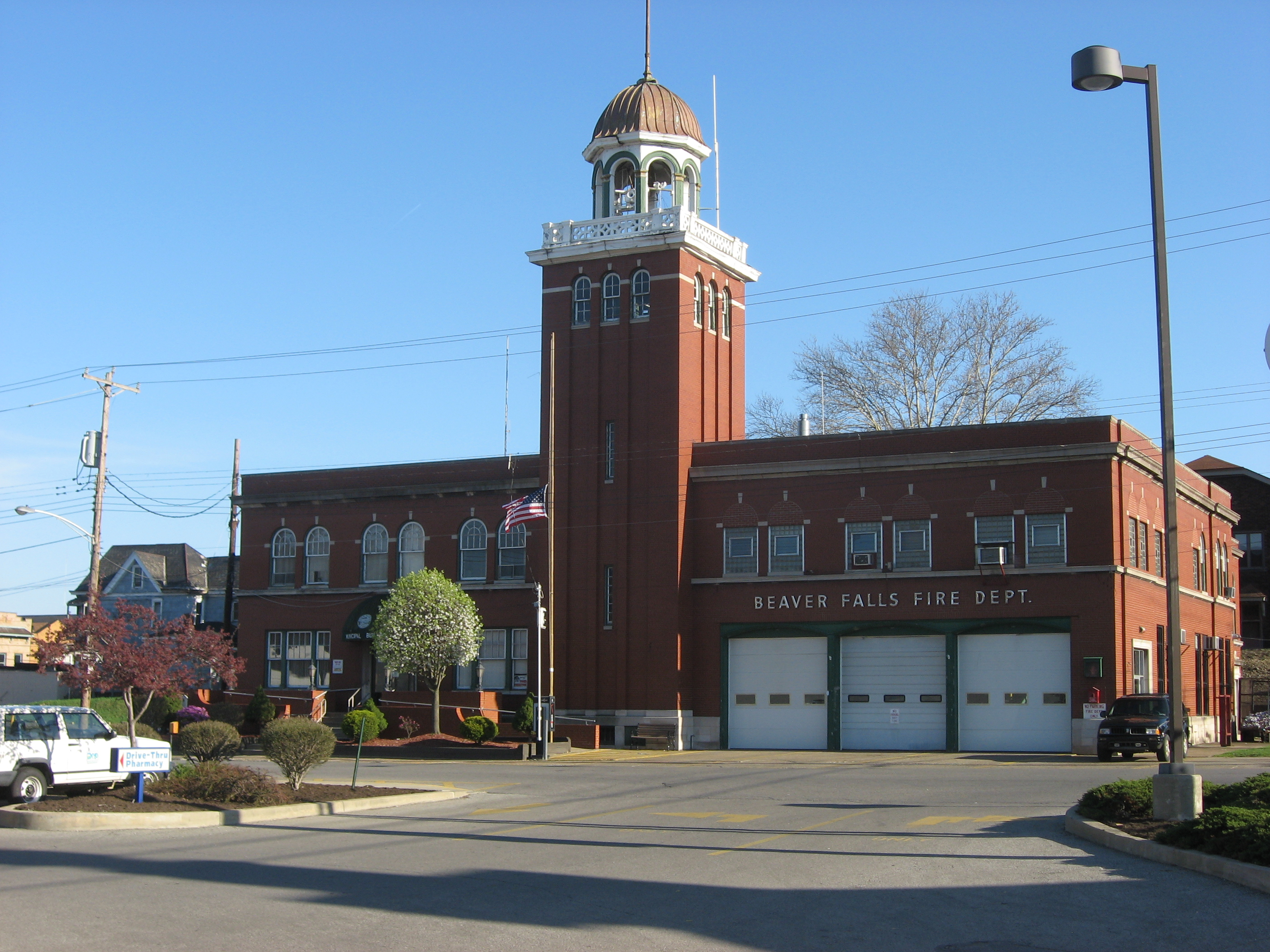
Beaver Falls City Hall

Beaver Falls had been a third class city under the Pennsylvania local government structure until a home rule charter went into effect on January 3, 2022. The city's charter maintains a commissioned mayor-council form of government; a mayor and four city council members constitute the commission and serve as the governing body of the city. Since the 2021 election cycle, the mayor has been Kenya Johns.

A city manager is employed to oversee day-to-day operations and oversight of the city’s main departments: Administration, Department of Finance & Taxation, Department of Public Works, Fire Department, Police Department, and Community Development.

== Education ==
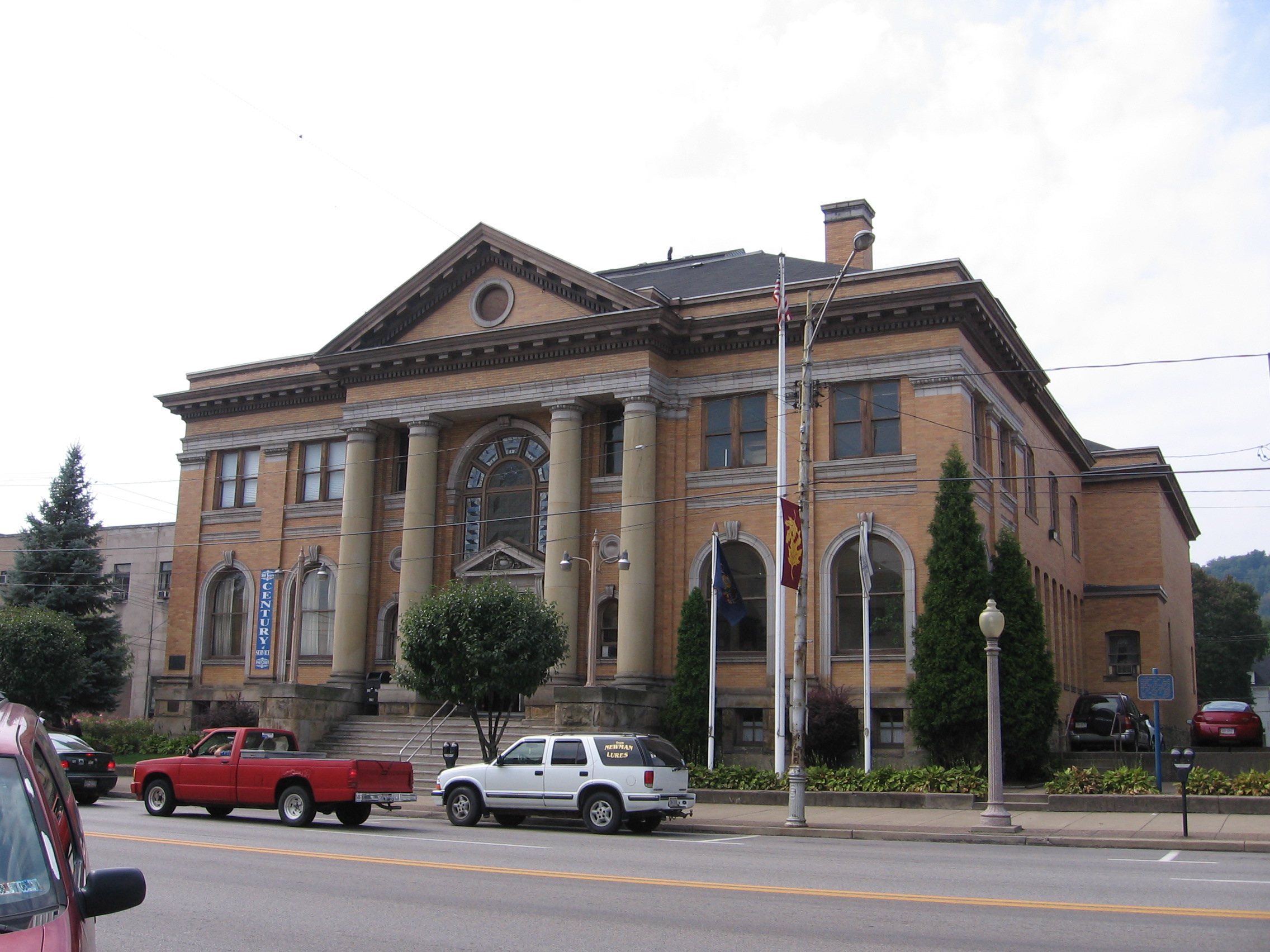
The Carnegie Free Library in downtown Beaver Falls

Children in Beaver Falls are served by the Big Beaver Falls Area School District, which includes two elementary schools, a middle school and a high school, Beaver Falls High School.

Beaver Falls has been the home of Geneva College, a private Christian liberal arts college, since 1880. Located in the city's College Hill neighborhood, the college has a student body of approximately 1,400 students. Their sports teams are called the Golden Tornadoes and compete as a member of the Presidents' Athletic Conference.

The city has a public library, the Carnegie Free Library of Beaver Falls, which was the first dedicated library building in Beaver County. It was a financed Carnegie library, opening in 1899.

== Transportation ==
The closest airport to the city is Beaver County Airport. Though located in Allegheny County, Pittsburgh International Airport is within close proximity of Beaver Falls, and is easily accessible by way of I-376 (former PA 60).

The following highways pass through Beaver Falls:

- State Route 18
- State Route 588

== Notable people ==
- Papa John Creach, blues violinist
- Darryl & Don Ellis, CMA and ACM nominated country music brother duo
- Ella M. George, teacher, lecturer, social reformer
- Herbert A. Gilbert, inventor of the electronic cigarette
- Albert Gwynne, former United States national basketball team and West Virginia Mountaineers athletic trainer
- Charles Keene, racing driver
- Nate Lewis, artist
- Tony Lip, actor
- Thomas Midgley Jr., chemist and engineer, known for his role in the development of leaded gasoline
- Ryan "Archie" Miller, former NCAA Basketball coach for the Dayton Flyers and Indiana Hoosiers, and current coach for the Rhode Island Rams
- Max Flick, former professional soccer player who played for North Carolina FC
- Joe Namath, Hall of Fame AFL and NFL quarterback
- Tom Tribone, energy entrepreneur, founded several major energy companies and early member of AES Corporation
- Mike Veon, former member of the Pennsylvania House of Representatives, known for his involvement in the 2006 Pennsylvania General Assembly bonus controversy
- Joe Walton, former American football player and coach, creator and head coach of football program at Robert Morris University
