= List of presidents of Allegheny College =

This is a list of the presidents of Allegheny College, located in Meadville, Pennsylvania, United States.

== Presidents of Allegheny College ==
- Timothy Alden - 1815–1831
- Martin Ruter - 1833–1837
- Homer J. Clark - 1837–1847
- John Barker - 1847–1860
- George Loomis - 1860–1875
- Lucius H. Bugbee - 1875–1882
- David H. Wheeler - 1883–1888
- Wilbur G. Williams - 1888–1889
- David H. Wheeler - 1889–1893
- William H. Crawford - 1893–1920
- Fred W. Hixson - 1920–1924
- James Albert Beebe - 1926–1930
- William Pearson Tolley - 1931–1942
- John Richie Schultz - 1942–1947
- Louis T. Benezet - 1948–1955
- Lawrence Lee Pelletier - 1955–1980
- David Baily Harned - 1980–1985
- Raymond P. Shafer - 1985–1986
- Daniel F. Sullivan - 1986–1996
- Richard J. Cook - 1996–2008
- James H. Mullen, Jr. - 2008–2019
- Hilary L. Link - 2019–2022
- Ron Cole - 2022–present
