= Mia Westerlund Roosen =

American sculptor (born 1942)

- Born: Mia Westerlund; 1942 (age 82–83); New York City, New York, United States
- Education: Art Students League of New York
- Known for: sculptor
- Movement: Postminimalism
- Awards: Guggenheim Fellowship, Anonymous Was A Woman Award, Fulbright Program

Mia Westerlund Roosen, Box 2, epoxy resin, 16" x 16" x 47", 2020.

Mia Westerlund Roosen (born 1942) is an American sculptor known for largely abstract, often monumental works that reference the body, eroticism, and primal forms.

Westerlund Roosen emerged as a sculptor during the male-dominated ascendancy of minimalism, and was one of a handful of women represented by renowned art dealer Leo Castelli in the 1970s and 1980s. Critics such as Saul Ostrow and Lilly Wei characterize her art as postminimalist and feminist-influenced, noting its privileging of organic form, handmade processes and surfaces, and evocative possibilities. Wei placed Westerlund Roosen among a pioneering group of women that "breached the barricades of Minimalism," individually producing work whose "distinctive, even eccentric forms and wide range of materials served as a rebuttal to the rational geometries, serialization, coolness, and crushing industrial scale" of that movement.

Westerlund Roosen has had solo exhibitions at the Castelli Gallery, New Museum, and Storm King Art Center, and appeared in shows at the Solomon R. Guggenheim Museum, Musée d'art contemporain de Montréal, and SculptureCenter, among others. She has been recognized with a Guggenheim Fellowship, Anonymous Was A Woman Award, and Fulbright grant. Her work belongs to the public art collections of the Metropolitan Museum of Art, National Gallery of Canada, and Albright-Knox Art Gallery, among others.

She lives and works in New York City and Buskirk, New York.

== Early life and career ==
Westerlund Roosen was born in New York City in 1942, and her early life was divided between there and Cuba. She lived in Toronto between 1964 and 1976. She considered both dance and art as career options, ultimately studying art at the Art Students League of New York; her sculptural focus on the body, flow and movement stems in part from this early interest in dance.

Westerlund Roosen moved between New York and Toronto in the 1970s, balancing family life and a nascent art career, whose reputation she initially built through exhibitions in Canada. Early highlights include solo shows at Willard Gallery, Leo Castelli, and The Clocktower Gallery (all New York), Sable-Castelli (Toronto), and the Vancouver Art Gallery. She also appeared in group shows at the Art Gallery of Ontario, Musée d'art contemporain de Montréal, and National Gallery of Canada.

== Work and reception ==
Mia Westerlund Roosen, Muro Series lX, concrete and steel, 210" x 105" x 22.5", 1978.

Art writers place Westerlund Roosen's work within a postminimalist tradition indebted to artists such as Eva Hesse and Louise Bourgeois, which balances formal and associative concerns and emphasizes materials, surfaces and process, the body and sexuality, and qualities such as awkwardness and uncertainty. She has produced work ranging from drawings to small pedestal-based objects to monumental sculpture (indoor and outdoor), using materials including resin, felt, cast concrete, lead, copper, bronze, encaustic, ceramic and plaster.

In the 1970s, she began adapting minimalist strategies to the exploration of expressive and erotic content, using pared down irregular, biomorphic forms. Saul Ostrow described her work's development as "non-linear and non-developmental," with recurring motifs and shifts between non-referential and imagistic forms that often serve as synecdoches for the female body. Art in America critic Janet Koplos wrote that her work "captures sensation or gesture rather than image; the genius of her abstraction is that the forms convey physical feelings that viewers may internalize."

=== Early sculpture and Muro series ===
In her early career, Westerlund Roosen favored materials such as fabric, thread and polyester resin, often fashioned into draped and pleated wall or floor pieces. In the mid-1970s, she produced her well-known Muro series, pouring concrete (and sometimes asphalt) to form thin horizontal slabs that became monolithic vertical surfaces when stood side by side or back to back. They melded minimalist objecthood, aspects of monochromatic and shaped-canvas painting, and handmade, trowel-textured surfaces into a physicality that critics described as emotive, "eloquent and august." The Muro Series III (1977) consisted of massive concrete wedges separated by very narrow air spaces and embellished with caps of roofing copper or heavy plates of oxidized metal. Artforum's Leo Rubinfien wrote that they appeared "at once flexible and stationary, playful and serene, suggesting a mingling of intellect and sensuality [and] a sense of having sprouted full-grown."

Mia Westerlund Roosen, Bariton, concrete and lead, 22" x 50" x 23", 1986.

=== Biomorphic sculpture (1980–1996) ===
Critics identified a revitalization in Westerlund Roosen's work in the 1980s that turned from a more formalist and sublimated approach to an embrace of plasticity, figural forms, and modularity. The work's more fleshy, visceral elements and evocative qualities extended its reach into a psychological realm that encompassed eroticism, humor, mystery, repulsion and dread. The New York Times suggested that the monumental scale and material transfigurations of her forms blurred their anatomical reference, creating an abstraction that recalled Georgia O'Keeffe and the Surrealist traditions of sexually suggestive or whimsical biomorphism (e.g., Jean Arp, Joan Miró).

Reviews in Art in America and ARTnews, compared her 1982 show at Castelli to a natural history museum exhibition, with diverse, universal, and perhaps subconscious, forms suggesting fossilized fragments or objects sharing common origins in time or place. Playwright Edward Albee later wrote that her sculptures "seemed to have existed where they sit—wherever they sit—forever. They are truly prehistoric, and if there is a collective unconscious, then that is their domain." Her figural pieces consisted of simple structures (ranging from 15' high to palm-sized)—hulks and surging or swelling, curved forms resembling gargantuan tusks, bones and body parts—with complex, varied surfaces covered in mottled, crusty "epidermises" of encaustic or lead. Two sculptures were compared to works by Brâncuși: Sleeping Beauty (1980)—a large, leaden arc with a sectioned spine, and Pompadour (1986), which consisted of two elephantine, limb-like forms, locked in an embrace. New York Times critic Grace Glueck wrote, the "ungainly but endearing [forms] invade and unsettle the viewer's grip on plausibility… Willful and enigmatic, these objects have considerable authority."

In later sculptures Westerlund Roosen employed repetition and seriality as a generative device suggesting formal mutation or mitosis. She often layered or lined up large, irregular discs (Olympia, 1990) or planar, flange-like shapes, inviting organic associations with micro- and macro- or technological systems. Critic Vivien Raynor described the juxtaposition of minimalist shapes, biomorphic association, and hand-worked surfaces in Petal Peace I (seven bent forms recalling nestled tropical shapes or fungi) or Petal Piece II (stacked breast-like protuberances) as both disconcerting and reminiscent of the forms and humor of Isamu Noguchi. Westerlund Roosen's SculptureCenter exhibition (1991) centered on American Beauties: nine, back-to-back breast forms assembled into a 20-foot-long, low "machine" that Michael Brenson wrote, "suggested the blades of a sexual reaper, or a battalion of baby pacifiers, or a Stone Age chariot of wrathful fire" with a "comical but irrepressible force" of sisterhood. Promises Promises Promises (1991) employed eight upturned and parted, massive lips that were eerily sensual and ambiguous enough to be oral or vaginal.

Mia Westerlund Roosen, American Beauties, concrete and pink granite, 2' x 28' x 16', 1991.

=== Outdoor and earth works (1994– ) ===
In the mid-1990s, Westerlund Roosen turned to site-specific outdoor and earth works, most significantly in a 1994 Storm King Art Center exhibition in which she sought to fuse object-making, large gesture and the earth. Several works incorporated trenches cut into the ground, modular organic and geometric forms, and hand-finished, skin-like surfaces. The largest, Adam's Fault (1993–4), was an 80-foot-long trench whose side walls were studded with rows of boulder-like, concrete forms, reminiscent of a dig of partially excavated bones and (in title) the battle of the sexes. Bethlehem Slouch (1993) consisted of eleven rippled, overlapping sheets recalling gills or a supple spine, which she choreographed into an undulating wave emerging from the ground. Her 1995 exhibition at Shoshana Wayne included the indoor earthwork, Madam Mao, an enormous mound of earth (6' x 30' x 20' and 18 tons) that rose into a tapered peak crowned by a long, narrow, visceral cavity of pearly pink concrete evoking giant female genitalia. Los Angeles Times critic Susan Kandel termed it a tongue-in-cheek, monumental image of feminine "lack" that answered the "masculine posturing" of earth artists such as Michael Heizer.

In 2010, Westerlund Roosen displayed three 10-foot-tall, concrete and architectural foam works using curved elements on New York's Upper East Park Avenue: Baritone, Juggler, and French Kiss, which conjoined comma-like forms evoking two tongues.

=== Later sculpture (1999– ) ===
In later work, Westerlund Roosen incorporated more varied approaches, revisiting the layered and stiffened cloth methods of her earlier sculpture, exploring expressive forms bearing Renaissance and Baroque influences, and producing both smaller, statuary-like pieces and sprawling arrangements of forms and lines. Parts and Pleasures (2002) was a pink-tinted concrete work consisting of large rippled disks, irregular balls, cylinders, and rope-like forms strewn across the floor, whose repetition and connection suggested a vaguely functional system that had rapidly dissipated. Janet Koplos interpreted the work's bursting of bounds, loss of control and release as a visualization of the "tension and dissolution" of a woman’s orgasm. For her 2004 show, "Namesake," Westerlund Roosen exhibited five modestly scaled, abstract sculptures in poured concrete, each named for a historical or mythological woman—Althea, Magdalena, Victoria, Clio, and Iris, a calligraphic composition of tentacle-like tangles that emerged from two ovoid forms and activated interior, empty spaces.

In her felt and resin works, Westerlund Roosen departed from the more closed and monolithic cast concrete process, breaking up mass and volume and introducing a lyrical sense of openness and dynamism. These expressive, somewhat ungainly works featured wavy flaps and curlicues of stiffened felt that cantilevered out from upright supports or trunks and seemed frozen in time and space (e.g., the Dervish, Carmelite and Falls series, 2004–5). She extended the expressivity of this work with a series of eccentric, assemblage-like, pedestal-based objects in the early 2010s, which were unified by bold hues of deep red, marigold and sky blue, then sealed with smooth, buffed wax (e.g., Blue Madonna, Warts and All, 2010).

In the "Bridges" series (2014–5), Westerlund Roosen returned to the minimal, monolithic approaches of her early work, setting elementary, rectangular concrete forms atop one another in simple, rigorous compositions marked by uneven edges, rounded corners, bowed planes and visible imperfections that emphasized her creative process. Art historian Sidra Stich wrote that the series conveyed "a primal moment when art emerges as an evocative presence, resolute and personalized."

== Awards and public collections ==
Westerlund Roosen has been recognized with a Guggenheim Fellowship (1993), the Anonymous Was A Woman Award (2017), a Fulbright U.S. Scholar research grant (1996), and grants from the National Endowment for the Arts (1988–9) and Canada Council (1974). Her work belongs to the public collections of the Albany Museum of Art, Albright-Knox Art Gallery, Art Gallery of Ontario, Canada Council Art Bank, Metropolitan Museum of Art, National Gallery of Art, National Gallery of Canada, Neuberger Museum of Art, Rhode Island School of Design Museum, Solomon R. Guggenheim Museum, Storm King Art Center, Vancouver Art Gallery, and Yale University Art Gallery, among others.
