= Khodr Zaarour =

Lebanese-American international relations professor

Khodr M. Zaarour
- Born: 1969/70; Syr Daniyah, Lebanon
- Occupations: Professor, news correspondent
- Known for: Founder of Muslim American Public Affairs Council (MAPAC)

Academic background
- Education: A.A. (Allegheny College); B.A. (Duquesne University); M.A. (University of Pittsburgh); Ph.D. (Virginia Tech)

Khodr M. Zaarour (Arabic: خضر زعرور; born 1969/70) is a Lebanese-American professor of international relations specializing in Middle Eastern politics. He is faculty at North Carolina State University (NCSU), a correspondent for multiple media organizations, and founder of the Muslim American Public Affairs Council (MAPAC).

Born in Syr Daniyah, Lebanon, he immigrated to the United States in 1982 and settled in Pittsburgh, Pennsylvania. After briefly living in Texas, Zaarour moved back to Pennsylvania to earn two bachelor's degrees and two master's degrees in political science and related fields at Duquesne University and the University of Pittsburgh. He later earned his Ph.D. at Virginia Tech. Throughout his career, he has taught at five universities, and is currently a full-time professor at NCSU.

In 2002, Zaarour founded MAPAC, an organization which lobbies on behalf of Muslim Americans and offers political endorsements. He has since served on the boards of several organizations, including the Human Relations Commission for the City of Raleigh and Research Committee 46 of the International Political Science Association. Since 2025, he has frequently contributed analysis and opinion pieces relating to Middle Eastern politics for media outlets, including Al Jadeed, Medi 1 TV, and Voice of Lebanon.

== Personal life and education ==
Zaarour was born in either 1969 or 1970 in Syr Daniyah, Lebanon. On 10 April 1982, he and his mother immigrated to the United States, following his father who had come to the US in the early 20th century. They settled in Pittsburgh, Pennsylvania, where Zaarour attended Greenway Middle School for 7th and 8th grade. After being required to memorize the Gettysburg Address in the latter grade, Zaarour first became interested in American history and politics. After attending Brashear High School for 9th grade, Zaarour and his family moved to Houston, Texas, in 1985, where he attended Robert E. Lee Senior High School until graduation in 1988.

After taking a gap year, Zaarour moved back to Pittsburg in July 1989 where he enrolled at Allegheny College, later graduating with an associate degree in social science. He then enrolled at Duquesne University, where in 1993, he earned double bachelor's degrees in political science and history, and in December 1994, a master's degree in "Liberal Studies and Political Science". While enrolled at Duquesne, Zaarour was elected president of the university's College Republican club. Additionally, upon the outbreak of the Iraqi invasion of Kuwait and subsequent Gulf War, Zaarour participated in protests on campus against the American military response, and subsequently made his first lobbies to congress with the aims of ending economic sanctions on Iraq. Upon the start of Second Intifada in 2000 and assassination of Rafic Hariri in 2005, he further lobbied support for Palestinians and Lebanese before congress, respectively. In 1996, Zaarour enrolled at University of Pittsburgh where he earned an additional Master's in "International Relations and International Security Studies" in May 1998.

In 2014, Zaarour enrolled in the Virginia Tech School of Public and International Affairs, where he earned a Doctorate of Philosophy in "Planning, Governance and Globalization" in 2020. The doctorate's focus was in American foreign policy, Middle Eastern politics, and international security. As part of his doctoral dissertation he published a journal article, State Sponsored Terrorism and Its Effects on Lebanese Policy and Politics, and a book, Varying Views of Democracy Among Iraqi Citizens, 2005-2018, the latter focused on democracy in Iraq after the 2003 invasion.

== Career ==
Location of universities Zaarour has taught at

Between 1998 and 2000, Zaarour began his career as an intern for the Middle East Institute as an educational researcher, National Defense University as a policy analyst, and United States Information Agency as a regional desk officer, all located in Washington D.C.. Since 2000, he has near-continuously worked in some form of tertiary education. By the 2002–03 academic year, Zaarour taught history, international relations, and political science as an assistant professor at Shaw University. He continued to teach at Shaw until at least the 2011–12 academic year in the same position, while also serving as the university's international relations program coordinator. By 2024, Zaarour began to teach at North Carolina State University for similar classes as a professor in the College of Humanities and Social Sciences. Zaarour has also worked as an adjunct professor at North Carolina Central University since at least 2011, and Virginia Tech, and taught in some form at Hampton University. Without teaching there, he has also given lectures for other universities including California Lutheran University.

=== Professional organization involvement ===
Zaarour has worked for several professional organizations. In response to the increase in islamophobia following the September 11th attacks, Zaarour founded the Raleigh, North Carolina–based Muslim American Public Affairs Council (MAPAC) in 2002, which lobbies on behalf of Muslim Americans. On October 2, 2007, Zaarour, representing MAPAC, was part of an effort which successfully lobbied for Ramadan to be recognized as a holy month by the US House of Representatives. In addition to lobbying, Zaarour also assumed responsibility for the organization in its interactions with NGOs like Doctors Without Borders, and its political endorsements for Muslim voters. In 2006, as the organization's political director, Zaarour endorsed Democratic Party incumbent Brad Miller in the US House of Representatives elections in North Carolina for that year, as opposed to the Republican Party candidate because of some of their commentary. Zaarour continued to promote the Democratic party under MAPAC for the next decade until the 2024 US Presidential election, where as the organization's chair, he endorsed Green Party candidate Jill Stein and her running mate Butch Ware, as he believed their stance on Muslim issues was superior to those taken by the Democrats and Republicans. In 2025, Zaarour left MAPAC on good terms.

Zaarour has also served on the boards for the Raleigh chapter of Sister Cities International beginning in 2022– acting as the city's ambassador for his hometown of Syr Daniyah in Lebanon, on the Human Relations Commission board for the City of Raleigh beginning in May 2025, and on Research Committee 46 of the International Political Science Association beginning in September 2025. He also served on the board for the North Carolina chapter of the American Civil Liberties Union.

=== Correspondent work ===
Zaarour has frequently appeared on Lebanese media stations in discussion of Lebanon–US relations

Beginning as an academic requirement but increasing in frequency by 2025, Zaarour has contributed analysis and opinion pieces for multiple Lebanese media stations, including Al Jadeed, OTV, Radio Liban Libre, Sawt Beirut International, and Voice of Lebanon, on topics including Iran–Lebanon relations, Lebanon–US relations, China–US relations, the Hezbollah–Israel conflict, and Israel–Somaliland relations, all within the context of the Middle Eastern crisis started in 2023. He also has contributed pieces for the Egyptian-based Al-Masry Al-Youm and Al-Jumhur, Moroccan-based Medi 1 TV, Saudi-owned London-based Al Majalla, and UAE-based Erem News.

== See also ==
- List of Lebanese Americans
- List of alumni (Allegheny College, University of Pittsburgh, Virginia Tech)
- List of people (Duquesne University, NCSU)
