= Specs Howard =

American radio personality (1926–2022)

Specs Howard (born Julian Liebman; April 8, 1926 – September 3, 2022) was an American radio personality who spent three decades entertaining audiences in Cleveland, Ohio, and Detroit, Michigan. He achieved notice as one of the members of the Martin and Howard Show in Cleveland during the 1960s before moving to Detroit. His chosen name "Specs" came from his lifetime of wearing glasses [spectacles] and his adopted surname "Howard" reportedly was taken randomly out of a phone book. He was a graduate of Allegheny College. At Allegheny, he had his first radio station which he later sold and went to work for another radio station.

== Professional career ==
In 1970, he created the Specs Howard School of Broadcast Arts in Southfield, Michigan, a suburb of Detroit. Since the school's inception in 1970, thousands of people have graduated and gone on to have successful radio and television broadcasting careers. In late 2009, the Specs Howard School of Broadcast Arts became the Specs Howard School of Media Arts due to the addition of graphic design and film courses.

== Death ==
Howard died on September 3, 2022, at the age of 96.
