= Victor Pickard (professor) =

- Born: (United States) Sewickley, Pennsylvania, U.S.
- Education: Allegheny College; University of Washington; University of Illinois at Urbana-Champaign
- Occupations: Professor, Annenberg School for Communication at the University of Pennsylvania
- Employer: University of Pennsylvania

Victor Pickard is an American media studies scholar. He is a professor at the Annenberg School for Communication at the University of Pennsylvania. He works on the intersections of U.S. and global media activism and politics; the history and political economy of media institutions; and the normative foundations of media policy.

== Background and education ==
Pickard was born in Sewickley, Pennsylvania, near Pittsburgh, and attended Quaker Valley High School and then Allegheny College. He earned a master's degree in communications from the University of Washington and, in 2008, a Ph.D. at the Institute of Communications Research at the University of Illinois at Urbana–Champaign, with a thesis "Media Democracy Deferred: The Postwar Settlement for U.S. Communications, 1945-1949."

== Academic career and policy work ==
Before teaching at Penn, Pickard was an assistant professor in the Media, Culture, and Communication Department at New York University. He also designed and taught the inaugural Verklin media policy course at the University of Virginia.

In Washington, D.C., Pickard worked on media policy as a senior research fellow at the media reform organization Free Press and the public policy think tank the New America Foundation. He was the first full-time researcher at New America's Open Technology Institute, where he continues to be a senior research fellow. He also served as a media policy fellow for Congresswoman Diane Watson and spent a summer conducting research as a Google Policy Fellow. Pickard has worked with the media literacy group Project Censored since 2020, and is a frequent guest on their weekly radio program and podcast.

== Scholarship ==
In 2009, Pickard was the lead author of a comprehensive report on the American journalism crisis, "Saving the News: Toward a National Journalism Strategy" (Published by Free Press). The report documented the roots of the crisis, potential alternative models, and policy recommendations for implementing structural reform in the American media system. The report was described as “the most intelligent and comprehensive proposed solution to the crisis in journalism" and listed as one of “2009’s Most Influential Media About Media.”

In 2011 Pickard co-edited with Robert McChesney the book Will the Last Reporter Please Turn out the Lights: The Collapse of Journalism and What Can Be Done To Fix It . The book provides an analysis of the shifting news media landscape and maps the ongoing debates about journalism's uncertain future. Booklist called it “Bold, meditative, engrossing, this is an indispensable guide for followers of modern media.” A review in Library Journal described it as highlighting "journalism's role as a crucial component of democracy and an institution that needs to be reinvigorated ... anyone concerned about the state of journalism should read this book."

Pickard's 2014 Book, America's Battle for Media Democracy, explores the history of the contemporary American media system came to be.

== Publications ==
=== Books ===
- Robert McChesney & Victor Pickard, eds. (2011). Will the Last Reporter Please Turn out the Lights: The Collapse of Journalism and What Can Be Done To Fix It. New York: The New Press.
- Victor Pickard (2014). America’s Battle for Media Democracy: The Triumph of Corporate Libertarianism and the Future of Media Reform. Cambridge University Press
- Victor Pickard (2020). Democracy Without Journalism?: Confronting the Misinformation Society. New York, NY: Oxford University Press. ISBN 9780190946753

=== Reports ===
- Victor Pickard, Josh Stearns & Craig Aaron (2009). “Saving the News: Toward a National Journalism Strategy,” Free Press, Washington, D.C.
