= Diocese of Pittsburgh =

Diocese of Pittsburgh may refer to:

- Episcopal Diocese of Pittsburgh (a part of the Episcopal Church in the United States of America)
- Anglican Diocese of Pittsburgh (a part of the Anglican Church in North America)
- Roman Catholic Diocese of Pittsburgh, a Roman (Latin) Catholic diocese
- Byzantine Catholic Archeparchy of Pittsburgh, the Catholic archeparchy governing all of the Byzantine Catholic Church in the Western portion of Pennsylvania, eastern Ohio, and in the states of Louisiana, Oklahoma, Texas, and West Virginia
- Orthodox Church in America Archdiocese of Pittsburgh and Western Pennsylvania
