= Arthur Braverman =

American author and translator

- Born: December 8, 1942 (age 83); Bronx (New York City)
- Education: City College of the City University of New York; Columbia University
- Occupation: writer/translator/teacher
- Writing career
- Subject: Zen Buddhism

Arthur Braverman is an American author and translator, primarily translating from Japanese to English. A Zen Buddhist practitioner, Braverman lived in Japan for seven years and studied at Antai-ji temple in 1969 training under Kosho Uchiyama. In 1978 he returned to the United States and studied classical Japanese at Columbia University. He lives in Ojai, CA with his wife.

== Works ==
- Living and Dying in Zazen: Five Zen Masters of Modern Japan
- Dharma Brothers: Kodo and Tokujoo, An historical novel based on the lives of two Zen masters, Kodo Sawaki and Kozan Tokujoo Kato.
- Bronx Park: A Pelham Parkway Tale, a work of fiction set in the 1950s/1960s centered around friendship in the Bronx.

== Translations ==
- Mud and Water: The Collected Teachings of Zen Master Bassui
- Warrior of Zen: The Diamond-Hard Wisdom Mind of Suzuki Shosan
- A Quiet Room: The Poetry of Zen Master Jakushitsu
