= James Purdy (scholar) =

American scholar of writing and rhetoric

James P. Purdy is an American scholar of writing and rhetoric. He is a professor of English/Writing Studies at Duquesne University and director of its writing center, and serves on the editorial board of Computers and Composition: An International Journal and Writing Spaces, an open educational resource for postsecondary writing education. Purdy received his BA in English from Pennsylvania State University (2000) and his MA and PhD in English/Writing Studies from the University of Illinois at Urbana-Champaign (2001, 2006). He has authored and co-authored articles on writing, intellectual property, research, pedagogy, and Wikipedia. His article "Valuing Digital Scholarship: Exploring the Changing Realities of Intellectual Work," co-authored with Joyce R. Walker, received the Ellen Nold Award for the Best Article in Computers and Composition Studies in 2011. He was also the recipient, in 2008, of the Kairos Best Webtext Award, for "Digital Breadcrumbs: Case Studies of Online Research" (also co-authored with Joyce R. Walker). In 2016, Purdy received the Presidential Award for Excellence in Teaching from Duqeusne University. In 2026, Purdy co-authored a journal article with Samir Nadra called "Is genAI a good editor of academic writing?", that examines how effective generative artificial intelligence tools apply to editing academic writings.

== Co-authored books ==
- The Effects of Intellectual Property Law in Writing Studies: Ethics, Sponsors, and Academic Knowledge-Making (with Karen J. Lunsford). New York: Routledge, 2020. ISBN 9781032400921
- Are We There Yet? Computers and the Teaching of Writing in American Higher Education–Twenty Years Later (with Jennifer Marlow). Logan, CO: Utah State University Press, 2021. ISBN 978-1-64642-240-1

== Edited collections ==
- The New Digital Scholar: Exploring and Enriching the Research and Writing Practices of NextGen Students (with Randall McClure). Medford, NJ: Information Today, 2013. ISBN 978-1-57387-475-5.
- The Next Digital Scholar: A Fresh Approach to the Common Core State Standards in Research and Writing (with Randall McClure). Medford, NJ: Information Today, 2014. ISBN 978-1-57387-495-3.
- The Future Scholar: Researching and Teaching the Frameworks for Writing and Information Literacy (with Randall McClure). Medford, NJ: Information Today, 2016. ISBN 978-157387530-1.
- Making Space: Writing Instruction, Infrastructure, and Multiliteracies (with Dànielle Nicole DeVoss). Ann Arbor, MI: University of Michigan Press, 2017. https://dx.doi.org/10.3998/mpub.7820727.
