= Mary Ellen Smith Glasgow =

American nurse, academic, author and researcher

- Born: 20th century
- Occupations: Nurse, academic, author and researcher
- Awards: Nightingale Award of Pennsylvania Nursing Education Academia Award

Academic background
- Education: ASN; BSN; MSN; Ph.D.
- Alma mater: Hahnemann Medical College; Gwynedd Mercy University; Villanova University; Duquesne University
- Thesis: Bone Marrow Donation: Factors Influencing Intentions in African Americans (2002)

Academic work
- Institutions: Duquesne University, School of Nursing

Mary Ellen Smith Glasgow (born 20th century) is an American nurse, academic, author and researcher. She is a dean of school of nursing, vice provost for research and a professor at Duquesne University, located in Pittsburgh, Pennsylvania.

Glasgow has written over 100 articles and book chapters. She is the co-author of four books, including Legal and Ethical Issues in Nursing Education: An Essential Guide, DNP Role Development for Doctoral Advanced Nursing Practice, and Legal Issues Confronting Today's Nursing Faculty: A Case-Study Approach. She has received the American Journal of Nursing Book-of-the-Year Award for her two of these books.

Glasgow was inducted as a Fellow in the American Academy of Nursing and as a NLN Academy of Nursing Education Fellow, and was selected as a Robert Wood Johnson Foundation Executive Nurse Fellow in 2009.

== Education ==
Glasgow studied at Hahnemann Medical College (now Drexel University) and received an Associate of Science Degree in Nursing (ASN) in 1981. She then enrolled at Gwynedd Mercy University and obtained a Bachelor of Science in nursing (BSN) degree in 1983. She then earned a Master of Science in nursing (MSN) degree with a concentration on nursing education from Villanova University in 1987, took her doctoral coursework at the Catholic University of America from 1996 to 1998, and her doctoral degree from Duquesne University in 2002.

== Career ==
Glasgow started her academic career as an adjunct instructor in the Nursing Education Department at Hahnemann University in 1987, and was promoted to assistant professor of nursing in 1990. Following this appointment, she joined Drexel University as assistant professor at the College of Nursing and Health Professions in 2002, and was promoted to a tenured associate professor in 2004, and then became a professor with tenure in 2011. She was appointed as a professor with tenure in the school of nursing at Duquesne University in August 2012.

At Drexel University, she held appointment as associate dean for undergraduate nursing and health-professions programs, MSN programs and continuing nursing education in 2004, and as associate dean for nursing in 2011. She was then appointed as dean of the school of nursing at Duquesne University in August 2012.

== Research ==
Glasgow's research primarily focuses on curriculum development, oncology, and leadership. She developed a BSN co-op program, BSN accelerated career-entry program, pathway to health-professions program, and other educational programs at Drexel.

=== Curriculum ===
Glasgow published a paper in 2010 focused on the importance and need of innovation in context of nursing education curriculum at the micro‐ and macro-system levels for the 21st century. In her study, she also described the innovative curriculum design of Accelerated Career Entry (ACE) Nursing Program, and discussed the challenges of this program. Furthermore, she determined the innovations in undergraduate and graduate nursing education while integrating ethics across the curricula.

=== Simulation ===
Glasgow evaluated transdisciplinary teamwork simulation experience in terms of improving collaborative attitudes among women's health students toward the goals of reducing medical errors. In 2014, she described professional development in Healthcare Simulation. She also demonstrated the impacts of a clinical simulation module in terms of training providers specializing in women's health, and presented a methodology regarding it.

=== Innovation ===
Glasgow studied the nature of innovation and the way it operates. She focused the viewpoints of innovators regarding problems, and discussed the novel ways to teach theory and practice of innovation, while determining how organizational cultures foster or suppress innovation. She along with co-authors addressed commissioned papers written on nursing education for “Transformational Models of Nursing Across Different Settings” to find solutions to the challenges facing the nursing profession. Furthermore, she demonstrated two innovative biomedical engineering and nursing collaborations designed to develop new knowledge and innovations and to educate a new cadre of professionals.

=== Leadership ===
Glasgow proposed the benefits regarding leadership program and executive coaching for new nursing academic administrators, and also studied the development and infrastructure needs which are required for success, while highlighting one college's model. She also conducted a study in 2005, and described the benefits and costs of integrating technology in context of undergraduate nursing programs.

== Awards and honors ==
- 1989 – Alumna of the Year Award, Hahnemann University College of Nursing and Health Professions
- 2000 – Oncology Nursing Society and Foundation Pharmacia and Upjohn Award, Ann Olsen Doctoral Scholarship
- 2011 – Book of the Year (1st place), American Journal of Nursing (AJN)
- 2012 – Book of the Year (1st place), American Journal of Nursing (AJN)
- 2013 – Distinguished Alumni Award, Gwynedd-Mercy College
- 2017 – Irish Education 100
- 2018 – Leadership Pittsburgh
- 2018 – Audrey Solberg Smith Distinguished Lecturer, University of Nebraska Medical Center College of Nursing
- 2018 – Nightingale Award of Pennsylvania Nursing Education Academia Award
- 2020 – Distinguished Scholar, Residence Virginia Commonwealth University

== Bibliography ==
=== Books ===
- Role Development for Doctoral Advanced Nursing Practice (2011) ISBN 9780826105561
- Legal Issues Confronting Today’s Nursing Faculty: A Case-Study Approach (2012) ISBN 9780803624894
- Role Development for Doctoral Advanced Nursing Practice (2017) ISBN 9780826171733
- Legal and Ethical Issues in Nursing Education: An Essential Guide (2020) ISBN 9780826161925

=== Selected articles ===
- Cornelius, F., & Glasgow, M. E. S. (2007). The development and infrastructure needs required for success-one college's model: Online nursing education at Drexel University. TechTrends, 51(6), 32.
- Suplee, P. D., & Glasgow, M. E. (2008). Curriculum innovation in an accelerated BSN program: The ACE model. International Journal of Nursing Education Scholarship, 5(1).
- Glasgow, M. E. S., Weinstock, B., Lachman, V., Suplee, P. D., & Dreher, H. M. (2009). The benefits of a leadership program and executive coaching for new nursing academic administrators: One college's experience. Journal of Professional Nursing, 25(4), 204–210.
- Glasgow, M. E. S., Dunphy, L. M., & Mainous, R. O. (2010). Innovative nursing educational curriculum for the 21st century. Nursing education perspectives, 31(6), 355–357.
- Casey, M., O'Connor, L., Cashin, A., Smith, R., O'Brien, D., Nicholson, E., ... & Egan, C. (2017). An overview of the outcomes and impact of specialist and advanced nursing and midwifery practice, on quality of care, cost and access to services: a narrative review. Nurse education today, 56, 35–40.
