= Jennifer S. Lawton =

American cardiothoracic surgeon

- Born: 1966 (age 59–60)
- Spouse: Mark Grimm (m. 1996)
- Children: 2

Academic background
- Education: B.S., 1988, Allegheny College; MD, 1992, Drexel University

Jennifer Sue Lawton (born 1966) (Note: In 2003, Lawton was reported to be 37) is an American cardiothoracic surgeon who specializes in adult cardiac surgery. She is the Richard Bennett Darnall Professor of Surgery and chief of the Johns Hopkins Division of Cardiac Surgery.

== Early life and education ==
Lawton was born to a single mother as the middle child of three children. Growing up, Lawton wished to become a paediatrician but the death of a grandparent caused her to begin studying heart disease. She earned her Bachelor of Science degree from Allegheny College before enrolling at Drexel University College of Medicine, formally affiliated with the Hahnemann University Hospital, for her medical degree. Following medical school, Lawton attended the Medical College of Virginia for her general surgery residency and became a research fellow in Ralph J. Damiano Jr's laboratory.

== Career ==
Upon the completion of her medical residency and fellowship, Lawton married surgeon Mark Grimm in 1996 and joined the faculty at the Washington University School of Medicine as an assistant professor. In 2008, Lawton was promoted to associate professor of surgery and named to the "Best Doctors In America" list. Two years later, she received a five-year, $1.33 million grant from the National Heart, Lung, and Blood Institute to fund her research project "Exploitation of the KATP Channel Opener Diazoxide during Cardiac Surgery."

During her tenure at the Washington University School of Medicine, Lawton studied the responses of isolated heart cells in response to stress. She specifically discovered that using drugs meant to stop the heart or preserve it for a transplant worked effectively to stop postoperative stunning (swelling of heart cells). Lawton also served in various leadership roles including as the president of Women in Thoracic Surgery (WTS), chair of the Basic Science Surgery Study Section of the American Heart Association, and vice chair of the Accreditation Council for Graduate Medical Education’s Thoracic Residency Review Committee. As president of WTS, Lawton established a fund to pay for general surgery residents to shadow female cardiothoracic surgeons, in an effort to encourage women to join the field of cardiac surgery.

After 15 years at Washington University School of Medicine, Lawton was hired as associate chief of cardiac surgery at Johns Hopkins University for the 2016–17 academic year. On December 1, 2016, Lawton was appointed professor and chief of the Johns Hopkins Division of Cardiac Surgery while continuing to serve as director of the Cardiac Surgery Research Laboratory. By July, she was promoted to the Richard Bennett Darnall Professorship in the Department of Surgery. Lawton also sits on the editorial board for The Annals of Thoracic Surgery and The Journal of Thoracic and Cardiovascular Surgery.

== Personal life ==
Lawton and her husband Mark Grimm have two children together.
