= Eric R. Braverman =

American physician

- Born: December 28, 1957 (age 68)
- Education: Brandeis University; New York University School of Medicine
- Occupation: Physician
- Organization: PATH Medical
- Website: www.pathmed.com

Eric R. Braverman (born December 28, 1957) is an American physician. He is the medical director of PATH (Place for Achieving Total Health) Medical and coordinator of clinical research for PATH Foundation NY, both of which are located in New York City. PATH has filed for bankruptcy in the United States Bankruptcy Court for the Southern District of New York.

Braverman's license to practice medicine in New Jersey was temporarily suspended from July 1996 to May 1997

== Education ==
Braverman earned his undergraduate degree from Brandeis University in 1979, and his medical degree from New York University School of Medicine in 1983.

== Career ==
Braverman served as clinical assistant professor of integrative medicine in neurological surgery at Weill Cornell Medical College (2008–2013), assistant attending physician at Cabrini Medical Center, and instructor in psychiatry at New York University School of Medicine. He is a member of the American Academy of Anti-Aging Medicine, the American Society of Bariatric Physicians, the American Neuropsychiatric Association, the Quantitative EEG Board, and the American Society of Addiction Medicine.

== PATH Medical ==
Braverman is the founder and medical director of the Place For Achieving Total Health (PATH) Medical, PC, a medical practice where his focus is brain health, and he promotes the use of hormone replacement therapy and dietary supplements. He operates Total Health Nutrients, Inc., and Total Health Nutrients, LLC, which market dietary supplements through PATH and online. Quackwatch has stated that PATH promotes and sells questionable health products, and has also accused Braverman of promoting quackery.

=== Temporary suspension of New Jersey Medical License (1996) ===
In July 1996, Braverman's license to practice medicine in New Jersey was suspended by the New Jersey Board of Medical Examiners after finding that he repeatedly misdiagnosed his patients and prescribed them inappropriate treatments. The New York Times also noted that Braverman has a radio show on which he advocated for alternative medicine.

Braverman's license was reinstated by the Board in May 1997. The board reprimanded Braverman for keeping inadequate records, performing an incomplete examination of a patient's wrist, and practicing medicine while under suspension. The Board noted that "while any violation may have been unintentional and may have been based upon the advice of counsel, Respondent acknowledges responsibility therefor."

The Board stated that "although the allegations at the inception of the case appeared to warrant a summary suspension based on the materials presented at the time, the Parties agree that, ultimately, based on substantial additional evidence adduced at the hearing, the suspension proved unwarranted." Braverman agreed to reimburse the state $20,000 to cover part of the costs from the investigation.

== Publications ==
- Braverman, Eric R. (2004). Edge effect. New York, NY: Sterling Publishing Co., Inc. ISBN 978-1-4027-1205-0.
- Braverman, Eric R.; Braverman, Dasha (2004). The Amazing Way to Reverse Heart Disease Naturally: Beyond the Hypertension Hype: Why Drugs Are Not the Answer (2nd ed.). Basic Health Publications, Inc. ISBN 978-1-68162-629-1.
- Braverman, Eric R. (2009). Younger (thinner) you diet: how understanding your brain chemistry can help you lose weight, reverse aging, and fight disease. New York: Rodale. ISBN 978-1-59486-777-4.
- Braverman, Eric R. (2007). Younger you: unlock the hidden power of your brain to look and feel 15 years younger. New York: McGraw-Hill. ISBN 978-0-07-146613-4.
- Braverman, Eric R. (2011). Younger brain, sharper mind: a 6-step plan for preserving and improving memory and attention at any age. Emmaus, Pa.: Rodale. ISBN 978-1-60529-422-3.
- Braverman, Eric R.; Capria, Ellie (2012). Younger sexier you: enjoy the best sex of your life and look and feel years younger (Paperback ed.). [Emmaus, Pa.]: Rodale. ISBN 978-1-60961-351-8.
- Shah, NR; Braverman, ER (2012). "Measuring adiposity in patients: the utility of body mass index (BMI), percent body fat, and leptin". PLOS ONE. 7 (4) e33308. Bibcode:2012PLoSO...733308S. doi:10.1371/journal.pone.0033308. PMC 3317663. PMID 22485140.
- Braverman, ER; Blum, K (2013). "Evoked Potentials and Neuropsychological Tests Validate Positron Emission Topography (PET) Brain Metabolism in Cognitively Impaired Patients". PLOS ONE. 8 (3) e55398. Bibcode:2013PLoSO...855398B. doi:10.1371/journal.pone.0055398. PMC 3604004. PMID 23526928.
