= William H. Parker (physicist) =

American physicist

William Henry Parker
- Born: 1941 (age 84–85)
- Citizenship: United States
- Education: Allegheny College, University of Pennsylvania
- Known for: Research regarding fundamental constants and solid state physics
- Awards: John Price Wetherill Medal (1975), Sloan Research Fellow (1968-1970), UCI Medal (2009)
- Scientific career
- Fields: Physics, academic administration
- Workplaces: University of California, Irvine

William H. Parker (born 1941) is an American professor of physics and academic administrator at the University of California, Irvine (UCI). Parker's earliest laboratory research involved seminal experiments that refined the precision of the measurements of fundamental constants. His later research focused on superconductors and other aspects of solid-state physics. In an administrative capacity at UCI, Parker has served in a variety of roles including as Dean, Department Chair, and Vice Chancellor.

== Education and research ==
Parker earned a bachelor's degree from Allegheny College in 1963. He obtained MS and PhD degrees from the University of Pennsylvania. He then joined the faculty of the Department of Physics and Astronomy at UCI in 1967 and he has remained there for his entire career. He was a Sloan Research Fellow from 1968 to 1970. In collaboration with Donald N. Langenberg and Barry N. Taylor, Parker used the alternating current Josephson effect to precisely measure e/h, the ratio of the elementary charge (e) to the Planck constant (h). This ratio could then also be used to refine the value of other fundamental constants such as the fine-structure constant (α). The new measurement of α removed a discrepancy between the theoretical and experimental values of the hyperfine splitting in the ground state of atomic hydrogen, one of the major unsolved problems of quantum electrodynamics at time. For this research, Parker received the John Price Wetherill Medal from the Franklin Institute in 1975. Parker's other research examined Josephson junctions and other aspects of low temperature physics including quasiparticle and phonon lifetimes, quasiparticle energy distribution in superconducting films, surface impedance, and thermal fluctuations in superconducting materials.

== Administration and teaching ==
At UCI, Parker has been Associate Vice Chancellor (1984 to 2000), Vice Chancellor for Research (2000–2006), Dean of Graduate Studies (2000 to 2006), Chair of the Department of Physics and Astronomy (2007 to 2012), and president of the university's Irvine Campus Housing Authority (1983–1990). He has won the Daniel G. Aldrich Jr. Distinguished University Service Award (1980 and 2008) and the UCI Medal (2009), UCI's highest award. Parker has twice won the School of Physical Sciences Outstanding Teacher Award.

Parker is coauthor of the book The Fundamental Constants and Quantum Electrodynamics.
