= Laurie Trok =

American art historian

- Born: Pittsburgh, Pennsylvania, United States
- Education: Duquesne University, Isidro Blasco
- Known for: Mixed Media

Laurie Trok is a mixed media artist living in Pittsburgh, Pennsylvania. She has worked with Brooklyn artist Isidro Blasco. She has shown at the Carnegie Museum of Art, Space Gallery, and has shown her work with the Westmoreland Museum of American Art. She has collaborated on community art projects in Pittsburgh. Trok's work was selected to highlight the lack of publicity of local women artists in the "Seen in Pittsburgh: Works on Paper by Women" by Graham Shearing. He hoped to "hand the curation of the show over to a rotating group of other curatorially minded individuals, preferably women."

Her pieces have been described as resembling lace. Her collages have depth due to them hanging by fine wire behind each other, existing in three or more planes constructed of cut paper. Other materials include window panes, vinyl, file folders, and other building supplies including scrap, Some of her work incorporates discarded windowpanes, with dimension achieved by applying vinyl to both sides of the glass. The pieces are constructed to utilize lighting to emphasize the shadows the cut outs casts.
