= Specs Howard School of Media Arts =

Media arts school in Southfield, Michigan

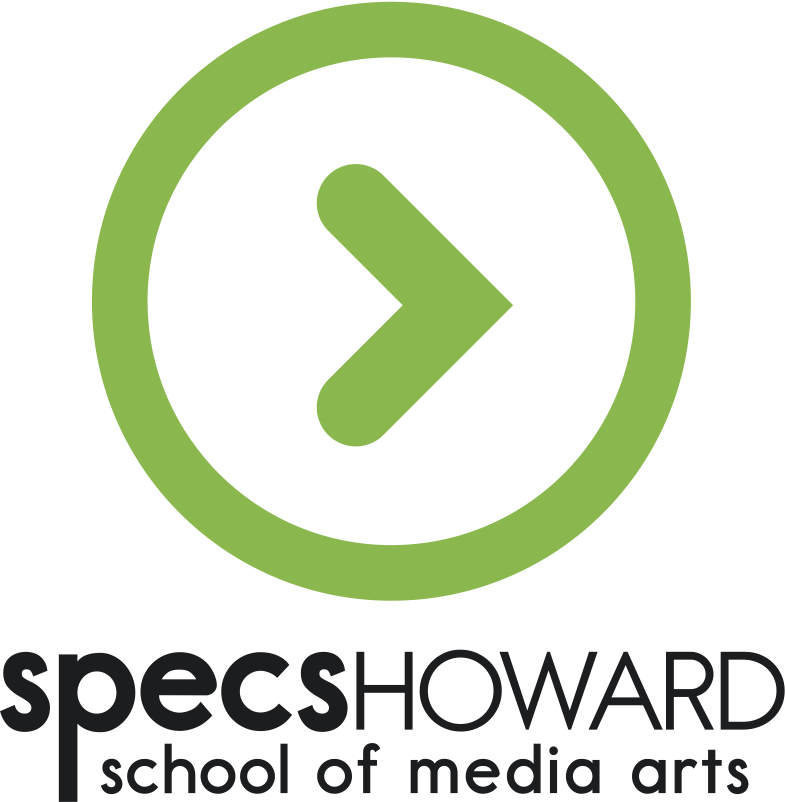
- Former names: Lee Alan School of Broadcast Arts, Specs Howard School of Broadcast Arts
- Motto: This is where you start, it's where I started.
- Type: Private for-profit career college
- Active: 1970–2021 (merged into Lawrence Technological University)
- Accreditation: ACCSC
- President: Martin Liebman
- Location: Southfield, Michigan, United States
- Campus: Urban
- Website: www.specshoward.edu

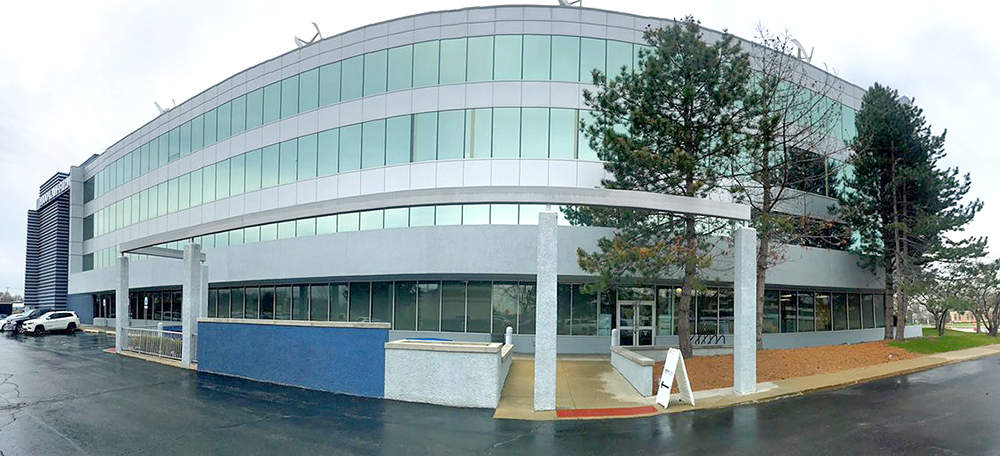
Specs Howard School of Media Arts on Lahser Road in Southfield

Specs Howard School of Media Arts was a private for-profit career college in Southfield, Michigan. It was named after its founder Specs Howard and focuses on programs in radio and television broadcasting, graphic design, and digital media arts. In 2021, Specs Howard School Of Media Arts relocated to the Lawrence Technological University campus and merged into Specs @ LTU.

== History ==
Specs Howard was born on April 8, 1926, in Kittanning, Pennsylvania. In 1948, he received a B.A. degree in history/political science and radio speech and dramatics from Allegheny College in Meadville, Pennsylvania. That same year, he opened his own radio station in Pennsylvania. Later, Howard moved to Cleveland and continued his broadcast career there. In 1962, he joined forces with Harry Martin, launching The Martin and Howard Show, which remained on the air in Cleveland until the duo moved to Detroit in January 1967. The show aired for another year in Detroit.

In 2009, the school changed its name to the "Specs Howard School of Media Arts" to reflect the broader scope of training offered.

In 2021, Specs Howard School of Media Arts formed a partnership with Lawrence Technological University in Southfield, Michigan, to become the new home of the media arts school. Lawrence Tech has had a relationship with the Specs Howard School since 2004 when an agreement allowed Specs Howard students to transfer various coursework to LTU's certificate and degree programs in media communication. Many students have taken advantage of that plan.

== Notable alumni ==
- Jack O'Malley, politician and broadcaster
- Tony Ortiz, sportscaster and sports talk show host
- Gary Yourofsky, animal rights activist and lecturer
