= Richard J. Cook =

American educator

Richard J. Cook is an American educator who served as the twentieth president of Allegheny College. He was previously the provost of Kalamazoo College. Prior to that, Cook served as a professor of chemistry.

On April 30, 2007, Cook announced he would step down as president of Allegheny College at the end of the 2007–2008 academic year.

According to Allegheny Magazine, Cook played a key role in the controversial change in Kalamazoo College's K plan from a year-round calendar to a three quarter calendar. At Allegheny College, he has promoted civic engagement.

Cook's undergraduate education was at the University of Michigan, while his graduate work in Chemistry was at Princeton University.
