= Muslim American Public Affairs Council =

Islamic organization based in North Carolina, the United States

Logo of MAPAC as of 2026

The Muslim American Public Affairs Council (MAPAC) is an American-Muslim political and public advocacy group headquartered in Raleigh, North Carolina.

== Overview ==
The group was founded in 2002 by Lebanese-American professor Khodr Zaarour. The mission of MAPAC is two-fold. First, it is focused on Political Affairs to participate in the political process in order to "Influence policies affecting Muslims, provide Islamic perspectives on various issues, and defend the civil rights of Muslims." Second, it is focused on mass media to develop a working relationship in order to "Present Islamic viewpoints on political and social issues, respond to defamation and misinformation of Islam and Muslims, and educate media personnel about Islam and Muslims."

MAPAC is one of the newer American Muslim advocacy group in the United States. It has hosted a number of progressive speakers, and recently brought Nihad Awad, Norman Finkelstein, and Cindy Sheehan.

It endorsed Jill Stein in the 2024 presidential election due to her support for Palestinian rights. It said Kamala Harris had not addressed issues of concern to Muslim voters and demonstrated an "unwavering support" for Israel.

== MAPAC-Live TV ==
MAPAC has its own regular television program in the Research Triangle called MAPAC-Live TV. It discusses current issues of local, national, and international topics. Guest panelists include both non-Muslim and Muslim individuals. The goal of the program is to give the media a Muslim voice and shed light on the misconceptions of Muslims and Islam.
