= Sylvia Braverman =

American artist

Sylvia Braverman (March 14, 1918 – 2013) was an American artist known for her drawings and paintings.

Her work is included in the collections of the Seattle Art Museum, the Pennsylvania Academy of Fine Arts and the Princeton University Art Museum.

In her later life, she lived and worked in Vence, France, where she died in 2013 at the age of 95.
