= Alan N. Braverman =

American executive

- Born: Alan N. Braverman; 1947 or 1948 (age 77–78); Boston, Massachusetts, United States
- Occupation: Media executive
- Known for: SEVP, General counsel and Secretary of The Walt Disney Company

Alan N. Braverman is the former senior executive vice president, secretary and general counsel of The Walt Disney Company.

== Early life and education ==
Braverman was raised in a Jewish family in Boston, Massachusetts, where his parents operated a children's clothing store. In 1969, he earned a B.A. degree from Brandeis University. After school, he worked as a VISTA volunteer in Gary, Indiana, before returning to graduate school. In 1975, he received a J.D. degree summa cum laude from Duquesne University in Pittsburgh, where he was editor-in-chief of the Law Review.

== Career ==
Braverman was promoted to executive vice president and general counsel, ABC, Inc., in May 2000 by Robert A. Iger, president of The Walt Disney Company, and was named executive vice president and general counsel of The Walt Disney Company in January 2003. In his role, Braverman oversaw the legal affairs of Disney, worldwide. Braverman stepped down from his position in early 2022.

Prior to his long tenure at ABC, Inc., Braverman worked at the Washington, D.C., law firm of Wilmer, Cutler & Pickering, where he started in 1976. He was made a partner in 1983, specializing in commercial and administrative litigation. Braverman began his career as a law clerk to Thomas W. Pomeroy Jr., Justice of the Pennsylvania Supreme Court. Braverman is on the board of directors for the Constitutional Rights Foundation, and he had the honor of giving the Commencement Speech at his alma mater, Duquesne University School of Law, in June 2009.

== See also ==
- Acquisition of 21st Century Fox by Disney
- The Walt Disney Company
