= Tom Tribone =

American founder and CEO

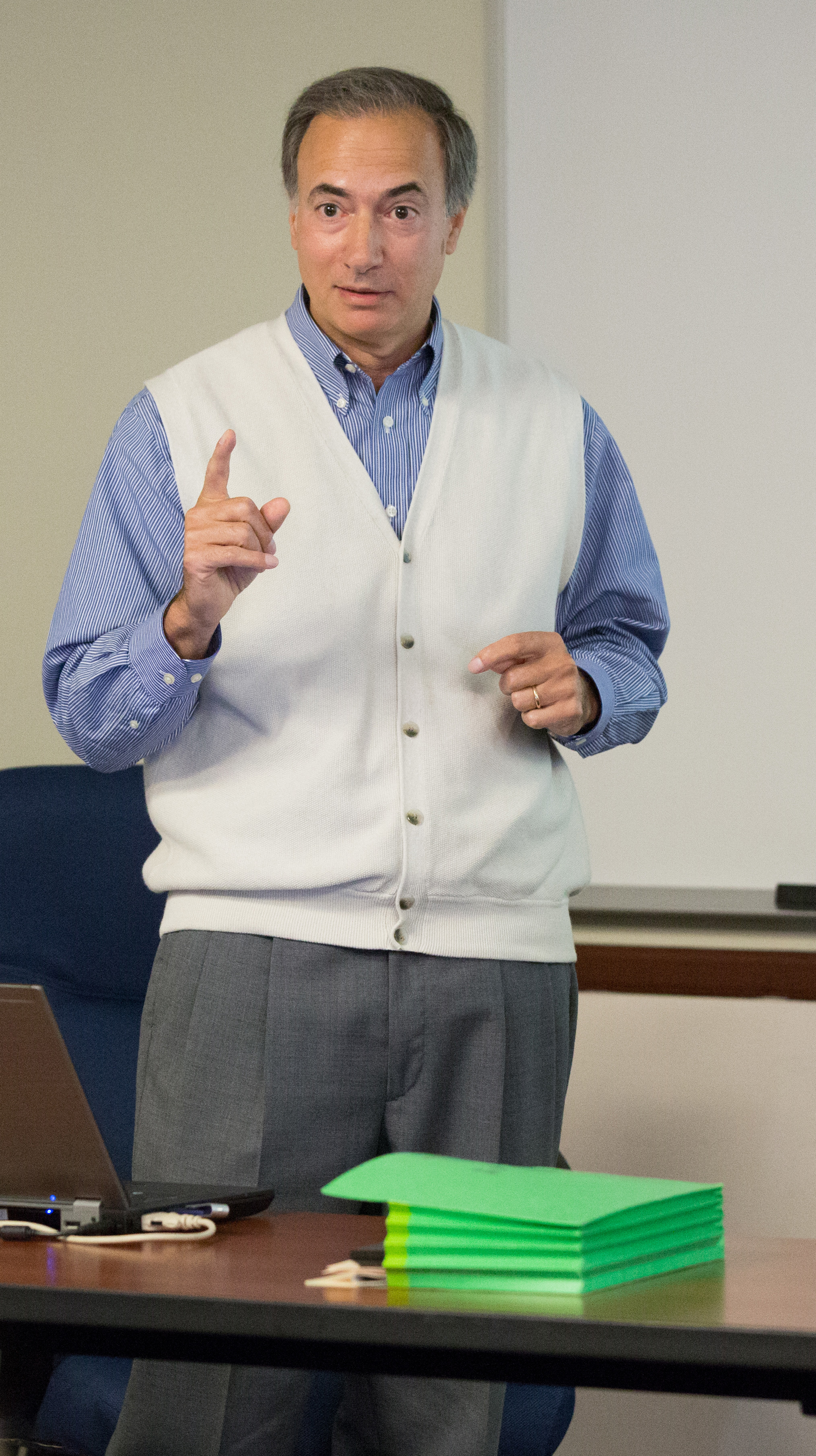
- Addressing Global Issues Class

Thomas Tribone is the founder and CEO of Franklin Park Infrastructure Inc. Franklin Park owns and manages energy and infrastructure businesses worldwide. The firm's main operating companies are located in North and South America, India, China and the Middle East. Franklin Park's business includes renewable and conventional energy, transportation, energy storage, logistics, biofuels and higher education. He has served as a board member for a number of corporate, industry and academic organizations. Tribone was an early member of the AES Corporation, serving as its Executive Vice President and number-two executive before he left to start Franklin Park. Earlier he held general management positions at Atlantic Richfield Company (ARCO).

== Business career ==
Early in his career at ARCO, Tribone advocated for and implemented the installation of some of the first acid rain pollution control equipment on industrial power plants. He then turned his focus to increasing energy productivity by the use of improved processes, such as Cogeneration. This work led to the commercialization of the initial large-scale, market-based power plants in the United States (as joint ventures between ARCO and AES) and to the introduction of competition in the previously monopolistic electricity sector.

These original projects marked the beginnings of the Independent Power Industry and formed the model later followed by the Renewable Energy sector. Much of the commercial and financial structure of these industries is rooted in this formative work. Tribone has originated and executed many of these large, path-finding transactions in both the United States and in major emerging markets, such as Mexico, Brazil, India and China.

Tribone was instrumental in setting up the Interregional Transmission Coordination Forum, or ITCF, in the 1990s. He served as vice chairman of the organization which consisted of the utilities in the Eastern Interconnection of the United States. As deregulation developed he and others recognized the need to jointly tackle regional loop flows, transmission access, rate pancaking, and the physics of wheeling across multiple utility territories. The ITCF implemented the General Agreement on Parallel Paths, or GAPP, which directly laid the groundwork for FERC's open-access policies and the eventual creation of regional transmission organizations and ISOs

Overseas, he completed the first direct foreign investment in Brazil’s energy sector after the full restoration of democracy and the election of Fernando Henrique Cardoso as President in the 1990s. He led transactions to open foreign energy markets, such as the first private power plant in Mexico and the first bilateral treaty between Brazil and Argentina for a natural gas pipeline. Activities like this and others, such as a power company dedicated to China, helped develop the concept of a global electric power industry. In China, Tribone was involved in bringing an efficient, environmentally friendly road-building technology developed in the United States, asphalt-rubber, to China for the first time.

In testimony before the U.S. Congress, Tribone observed that technological and market forces were “shrinking” the scope of natural monopoly. This line of thinking led him to believe that there would be societal benefits in merging regulated monopolies with competitive firms and he conceived and completed the earliest consolidations in the United States between monopoly utility companies, and competitive, non-utility firms. This consolidation has been a major, continuing trend. Tribone is described as a “most creative” new business developer in the book Joy at Work. In Joy at Work he was quoted as saying that "sometimes we have to try things out in practice to see if they work in theory" to express the idea that breakthroughs often are rooted in both analysis and a healthy dose of empiricism. Author Peter Grose, in his book Power to People, offers an additional description of Tribone’s entrepreneurial contributions.

Tribone was nominated as a finalist for the Standard and Poors Lifetime Achievement Award in 2016 and 2017. This award is granted by Standard and Poors as a Platts Global Energy Award and is often called the Emmy award for the energy industry. His Excellency Abdalla Salem El-Badri, the longest-serving secretary general in the history of the Organization of the Petroleum Exporting Countries (OPEC), and Harold Hamm, founder, chairman and CEO of Continental Resources ultimately won this award.

In 2017, Tom was inducted by Joe Namath into the Hall of Achievement of The Magical Coach Foundation for Business Leadership. Namath sponsors the foundation as a tribute to his high school coach.

In 2025, he was given the Baldridge Foundation Leadership Award. The Baldridge program was established by President Ronald Reagan to promote American competitiveness.

== Management style ==
As an undergraduate, Tribone was exposed to the research of psychologist Frederick Herzberg at Case Western Reserve University, where Herzberg served as a professor. Partly based on these findings and his own experience, Tribone developed a unique, people-centered management style that has been written about by authors such as Robert H. Waterman Jr. (the co-author of one of the most influential business books ever written, In Search of Excellence).

In his book, What America Does Right Waterman has written of Tribone: "But Tom Tribone is one of those people who resist the status quo. Tribone has the 'Colombo' factor, like Detective Colombo on the old television show, if something doesn’t make sense, Tribone asks why and keeps asking until he gets an answer that does make sense.” In this book, Tribone's ideas were summarized in the title of a chapter called "Everyone a Leader" in which Waterman described some of Tribone's management concepts. One example related how, while leading a unionized manufacturing plant early in his career, Tribone materially increased manufacturing capability and employee satisfaction through a new combination of specific guidance and light-handed supervision. In Robert M. Grant's case study, "AES Corporation: Rewriting the Rules of Management," Grant relayed Tribone's ideas on the subject of teams and how they can be, in Tribone's words, "a natural way to get big things done while preserving the dignity of each person."

== Board memberships ==
Past Board Memberships:

Center for Advancement of Energy Markets, Electric Power Supply Association, Powerline Communication Association,

U.S. Environmental Technology Institute, Argentine American Chamber of Commerce, India Infrastructure PLC,

Brazil U.S. Chamber of Commerce, Institute for Energy Innovation, Inter-regional Transmission Coordination Forum,

AES China Generating Company [NASDAQ:AESC], Infrastructure India PLC, Cemig S.A. Board of Directors [NYSE:CIG],

Electric Distribution of the Future Forum, Consumers Energy Council of America,

International Energy Development Council, Northern Virginia CYO Athletics Board of Directors, U.S. Chamber of Commerce,

Guggenheim Global Infrastructure Company, Duquesne University Board of Directors, Georgia Institute of Technology - The Strategic Energy Institute,

Current Board Memberships:

Case Western Reserve Univ - Great Lakes Energy Institute (Chair), United States Government - Special Government Employee, Columbia University Climate School, Georgia Tech Research Corporation

== Publications ==
Tribone, Tom (2021, February 25). How can Texas prevent another power failure? Washington Examiner.

Tribone, Tom (2022, July 27). A Russian oil price cap will not lower gas prices. Cleveland Plain Dealer.

Tribone, Tom (2024, August 5). How the US should be more strategic about engaging with Latin America. Dallas Morning News.

Tribone, Tom (2024, November 3). Keeping America No. 1 in AI means seeing energy as the catalyst. Cleveland Plain Dealer.

Tribone, Tom (2025, March 4). U.S. needs to win the AI race and ample electricity is vital. Crains Business.

== Education ==
Tribone received his Bachelor of Science (B.S.) in Chemical Engineering from Case Western Reserve University with Highest Honors and both his MBA and Juris Doctor (J.D.) from Duquesne University. He was awarded the Case Gold Medal. This award, which was originally established to recognize Nobel Laureates from Case, is Case's highest career recognition award. The Tribone Center at Duquesne provides free legal support to Veterans and other members of the Pittsburgh community.
