= John Price Wetherill Medal =

Scientific award

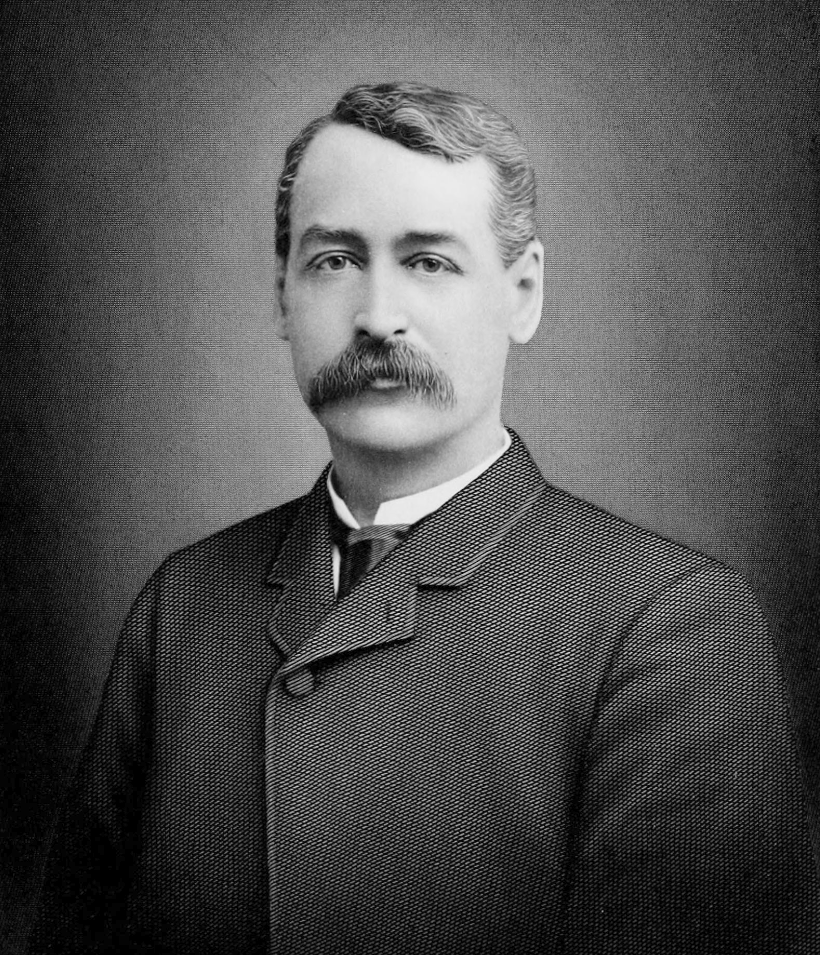
John Price Wetherill

The John Price Wetherill Medal was an award of the Franklin Institute. It was established with a bequest given by the family of John Price Wetherill (1844–1906) on April 3, 1917. On June 10, 1925, the Board of Managers voted to create a silver medal, to be awarded for "discovery or invention in the physical sciences" or "new and important combinations of principles or methods already known". The legend on the first medal read: "for discovery, invention, or development in the physical sciences". The John Price Wetherill Medal was last awarded in 1997. As of 1998 all of the endowed medals previously awarded by the Franklin Institute were reorganized as the Benjamin Franklin Medals.

== Recipients ==
- 1926 Frank Twyman, Wagner Electric Corporation
- 1927 Carl Ethan Akeley, North East Appliances Inc.
- 1928 Albert S. Howell, Frank E. Ross
- 1929 Gustave Fast, William H. Mason, Johannes Ruths
- 1930 Charles S. Chrisman, William N. Jennings
- 1931 Thomas Tarvin Gray, Arthur J. Mason, Edwin G. Steele, Walter L. Steele, Henry M. Sutton, Edward C. Wente
- 1932 Halvor O. Hem, Monroe Calculating Machine Company, Carl George Munters, Baltzar von Platen, Frank Wenner
- 1933 Henry S. Hulbert, Industrial Brownhoist Corporation, Koppers Company, Francis C. McMath, Robert R. McMath
- 1934 E. Newton Harvey, Alfred L. Loomis, Johannes B. Ostermeier
- 1935 F. Hope-Jones, Francis Ferdinand Lucas, Robert E. Naumburg, William H. Shortt, James Edmond Shrader, Louis Bryant Tuckermann, Henry Ellis Warren
- 1936 Albert L. Marsh
- 1939 William Albert Hyde
- 1940 Laurens Hammond, Edward Ernst Kleinschmidt, Howard L. Krum
- 1941 Harold Stephen Black
- 1943 Robert Howland Leach
- 1944 Richard C. DuPont, Willem Fredrik Westendorp
- 1946 Lewis A. Rodert
- 1947 Kenneth S. M. Davidson
- 1948 Wendell Frederick Hess
- 1949 Edgar Collins Bain, Thomas L. Fawick, Harlan D. Fowler
- 1950 Donald William Kerst, Sigurd Varian, Russell Varian
- 1951 Samuel C. Collins, Reid Berry Gray, Gaylord W. Penney
- 1952 Martin E. Nordberg, Harrison P. Hood, Albert J. Williams Junior,
- 1953 Robert H. Dalton, Stanley Donald Stookey
- 1954 William D. Buckingham, Clarence Nichols Hickman, Edwin T. Lorig
- 1955 Louis M. Moyroud, Rene A. Higonnet, Jacques Yves Pierre SeJournet
- 1957 Warren W. Carpenter, Martin Company,
- 1958 Henry Boot, J. Sayers, John Randall
- 1959 Robert B. Aitchison, Archer J. P. Martin, Anthony Trafford James, Clarence Zener, R. L. M. Synge
- 1960 Raimond Castaing, Walter Juda, Victor Vacquier
- 1961 Albert E. Hitchcock, Percy W. Zimmerman
- 1962 Ernest Ambler, Raymond Webster Hayward, Dale Dubois Hoppes, Ralph P. Hudson, Stanley Donald Stookey, Chien-Shiung Wu
- 1963 Daryl M. Chapin, Calvin Souther Fuller, Gerald L. Pearson
- 1964 Howard Aiken, John Eugene Kunzler, John Kenneth Hulm, Bernd Matthias
- 1965 Edward Ching-Te Chao, Wendell F. Moore, John Hamilton Reynolds, Frederick D. Rossini, Eugene Shoemaker, Fred Noel Spiess
- 1966 Howard G. Rogers, Britton Chance
- 1967 Ernest Omar Wollan
- 1968 Nathan Cohn
- 1969 George R. Cowan, John J. Douglass, Arnold H. Holtzman
- 1970 Paul D. Bartlett
- 1971 Felix Wankel
- 1972 Otto Herbert Schmitt
- 1973 A. R. Howell
- 1974 Aage Bohr, Ben Mottelson
- 1975 Donald Newton Langenberg, William Henry Parker, Barry Norman Taylor
- 1976 Herbert Blades, James W. Cronin, Val Fitch
- 1978 William Klemperer
- 1979 Elias Burstein
- 1980 Ralph Alpher, Robert Herman
- 1981 Frank F. Fang, Alan B. Fowler, Webster E. Howard, Frank Stern, Philip J. Stiles
- 1982 Lawrence A. Harris
- 1984 Eugene Garfield
- 1985 Lynn A. Conway, Carver A. Mead
- 1986 Alvin Van Valkenburg
- 1987 Dennis H. Klatt
- 1990 Akito Arima
- 1991 Peter John Twin
- 1992 Gerald E. Brown
- 1994 Stirling A. Colgate
- 1997 Federico Capasso

== See also ==
- List of engineering awards
- List of physics awards
