= Frank F. Fang =

Chinese-American solid-state physicist

Frank F. Fang (born 11 September 1930) is a Chinese-American solid-state physicist. Born in Beijing, he was part of the team that succeeded in 1966 in the detection of a two-dimensional electron gas and its quantum properties in semiconductors.

== Education and career ==
Fang studied at the National Taiwan University with a bachelor's degree in 1951 and the University of Notre Dame with a master's degree in 1954. In 1959 he received his doctorate in electrical engineering at the University of Illinois at Urbana-Champaign. In 1959/60 he worked for Boeing and from 1960 he did research at IBM.

John Robert Schrieffer had predicted 1956 quantum effects in electron transport due to the two-dimensional geometry in metal-insulator-semiconductor structure (MIS). The detection was first successfully achieved by the team of Fang, Alan B. Fowler, Phillip J. Stiles and Webster Eugene Howard at IBM in 1966 by applying strong magnetic fields.

In 1982 Fang was elected a Fellow of the American Physical Society. In 1984 he was elected an IEEE Fellow for "the discovery and explanation of two-dimensional properties of silicon inversion layers and for contributions to semiconductor device research."

In 1981, he received the Wetherill Medal from the Franklin Institute with Fowler, Howard, Stiles and Frank Stern; Stern and Howard gave the theoretical explanation of the 1966 experiment. In 1988 Fang received with Alan B. Fowler and Phillip J. Stiles the Oliver E. Buckley Condensed Matter Prize.

== Selected publications ==
- Fang, F. F.; Fowler, A. B. (1968). "Transport Properties of Electrons in Inverted Silicon Surfaces". Physical Review. 169 (3): 619–631. Bibcode:1968PhRv..169..619F. doi:10.1103/PhysRev.169.619.
- Fang, F. F.; Stiles, P. J. (1968). "Effects of a Tilted Magnetic Field on a Two-Dimensional Electron Gas". Physical Review. 174 (3): 823–828. Bibcode:1968PhRv..174..823F. doi:10.1103/PhysRev.174.823.
- Fang, F. F.; Fowler, A. B. (1970). "Hot Electron Effects and Saturation Velocities in Silicon Inversion Layers". Journal of Applied Physics. 41 (4): 1825–1831. Bibcode:1970JAP....41.1825F. doi:10.1063/1.1659111.
- Fang, F. F.; Fowler, A. B.; Hartstein, A. (1977). "Effective mass and collision time of (100) Si surface electrons". Physical Review B. 16 (10): 4446–4454. Bibcode:1977PhRvB..16.4446F. doi:10.1103/PhysRevB.16.4446.
- Luo, J.; Munekata, H.; Fang, F. F.; Stiles, P. J. (1988). "Observation of the zero-field spin splitting of the ground electron subband in gasb-inas-gasb quantum wells". Physical Review B. 38 (14): 10142–10145. Bibcode:1988PhRvB..3810142L. doi:10.1103/PhysRevB.38.10142. PMID 9945862.
