= Kinjiro Okabe =

Japanese electrical engineering researcher and professor

Kinjiro Okabe (岡部 金治郎, Okabe Kinjirō; March 27, 1896 – April 8, 1984) was a Japanese electrical engineering researcher and professor who made major contributions to magnetron and radar development. He did work after the Second World War on medical instruments using ultrasounds.

== Career ==
=== Split-anode magnetron ===
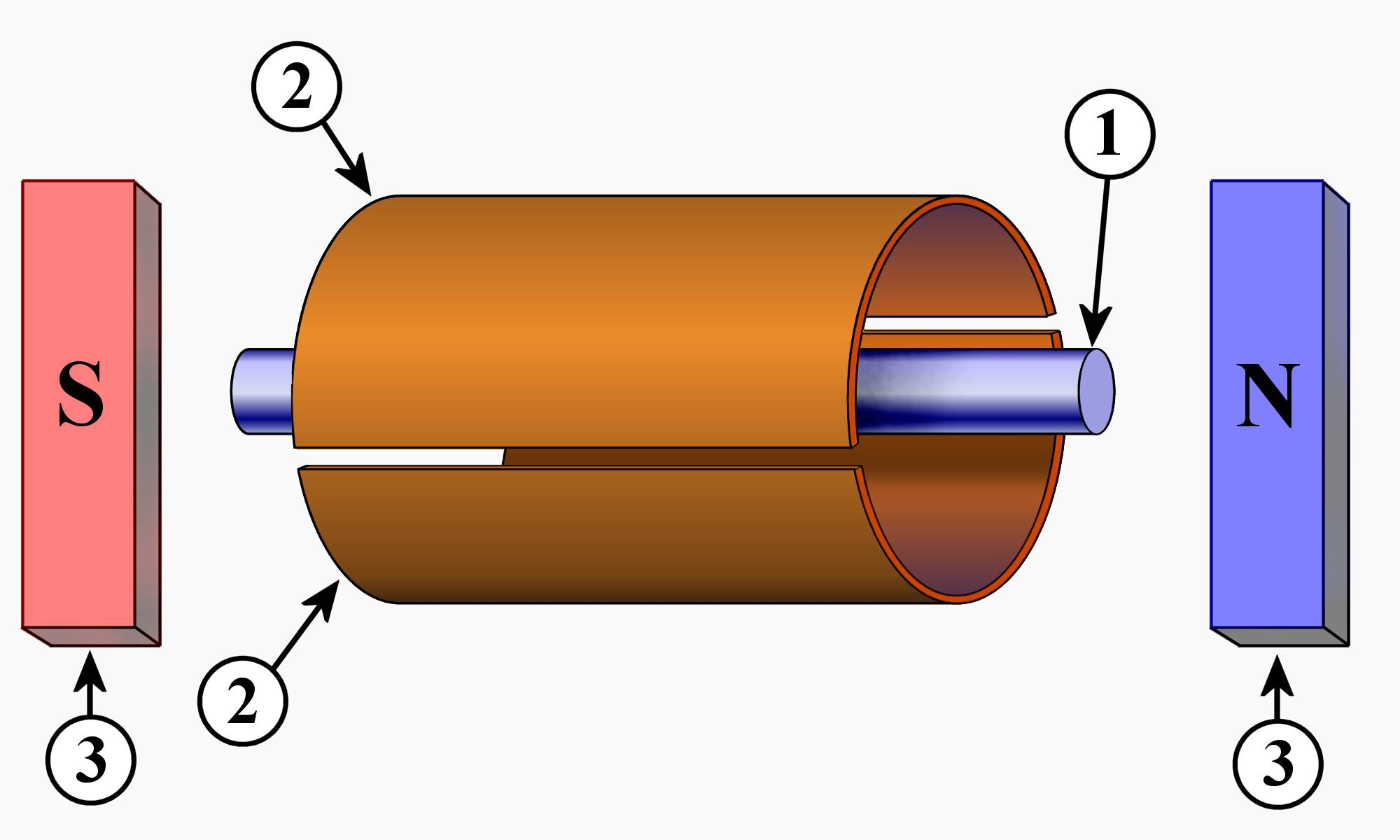
Split anode magnetron: 1) Cathode, 2) Anodes, 3) Permanent magnets

One of Japan's best-known radio researchers in the 1920s-1930s era was Professor Hidetsugu Yagi, who was initially at Tohoku University. He had become very interested in the magnetron, built and named by Albert W. Hull at General Electric in 1921. While Hull's magnetron was a HF device, Yagi was convinced that it could also be a generator of VHF or even UHF signals. Kinjiro Okabe was one of Yagi's first doctoral students and was encouraged by his mentor in this pursuit.

In 1926, Okabe developed a magnetron device that significantly decreased the operating wavelength of oscillations. He filed for a U.S. patent in 1926, which was granted in 1929 (No. 1,735,294). His work continued, and based on developing the split-anode device, he was awarded the Doctor of Engineering degree in 1928.

Okabe first published his findings in a Japanese journal, and followed with a foundational paper in the prestigious Proceedings of the IRE. While Hull had published on the HF magnetron years earlier, it was only after Okabe's detailed paper on generation at 17 cm that this device gained world interest. Although this was the first microwave magnetron, it was not immediately applied in communications because it was not frequency stable.

=== Telecommunication ===
Another of Yagi's early doctoral students, Shintaro Uda, had worked with Yagi in developing an antenna using a radically new configuration that they called a wave projector. Commonly called the Yagi–Uda antenna, this was soon used by Yagi, Okabe, and Uda in demonstrating a 40-cm microwave system with a magnetron and wave projector that achieved a transmission distance of about 1 km. This and other activities at the Tohoku Radio Laboratory was described in a 1928 seminal paper by Yagi.

In the early 1930s, Yagi moved to the Osaka Imperial University, where he was appointed Director of the Radio Research Laboratory. Okabe accompanied Yagi to Osaka and continued his research on magnetrons, ultimately making a split-anode device that generated oscillations at wavelengths down to about 12 cm (2.5 GHz). He also developed a hot-cathode discharge device (called the Osaka tube) that had characteristics similar to the Barkhausen–Kurz tube.

=== Research on radar ===
Technical specialists in the Imperial Navy became interested in the possibility of using radio to detect aircraft. For consultation, they turned to Professor Yagi who suggested that this might be done by examining the Doppler frequency-shift in a reflected signal. Funding was provided to the Osaka Laboratory for experimental investigation of this technique; Kinjiro Okabe was assigned to lead the effort. His theoretical analysis indicated that the reflections would be greater if the wavelength was approximately the same as the size of aircraft structures.

Okabe developed an experimental apparatus using a VHF transmitter and receiver with Yagi-Uda antennas separated some distance. In 1936, he successfully detected a passing aircraft by the Doppler-interference method; this was the first recorded demonstration in Japan of aircraft detection by radio. With this success, Okabe's research interest switched from magnetrons to VHF equipment for target detection.

The funding for Okabe's target detection project was not continued; the top levels of the Imperial Navy believed that any advantage of using radio for this purpose were greatly outweighed by enemy intercept and disclosure of the sender's presence. Okabe continued to devote much of his research to improving magnetrons. Although this technology was picked up by other organizations, including the Naval Technology Research Institute where Yoji Ito led in further improvements and the eventual incorporation in detection system for the Japanese military, Okabe continued to publish in the open literature.

During and following the war years, Okabe remained very active at the Osaka Laboratory. While Okabe's initial proposal for radio detection was not accepted by the military, time would see this position greatly change. The 1944 Order of Culture award for significant advancements in science and technology was presented to Okabe by the Emperor of Japan in recognition of his early efforts.

=== Medical applications ===
In 1955, his interest turned to medical applications of ultrasound, and he suggested to Shigeo Satomura, one of his graduate students, that he apply Doppler ultrasound techniques to medical diagnosis. This research was very productive, and led to new applications of this technology providing non-invasive localised imaging.
