= Yoji Ito =

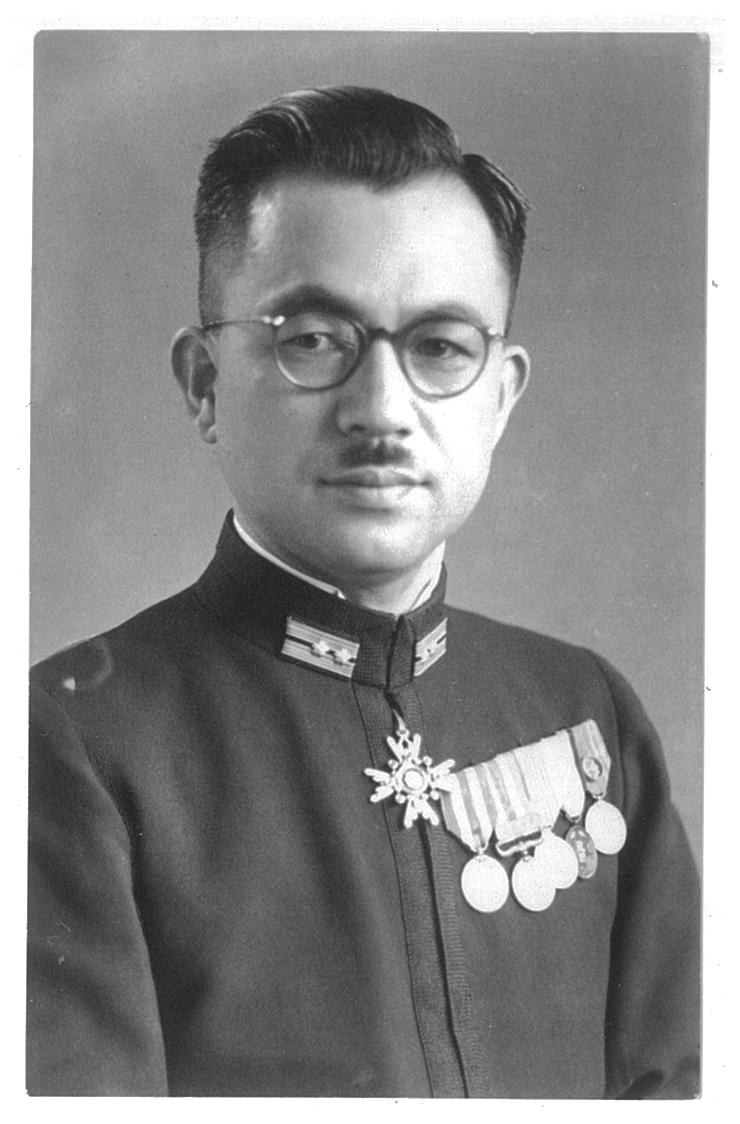
- Born: 5 March 1901; Chiba prefecture, Japan
- Died: 9 May 1955 (aged 54)
- Education: Imperial University of Tokyo; Dresden University of Technology
- Known for: Radar development in Japan
- Scientific career
- Fields: Physics

Yoji Ito (伊藤 庸二, Itō Yōji; 5 March 1901–9 May 1955) was an engineer and scientist who had a major role in the Japanese development of magnetrons and the Radio Range Finder (RRF – the code name for a radar).

== Early years ==
Yoji Ito was born and raised in Onjuku, then a fishing village in the Chiba Prefecture of Japan. His father was the primary schoolmaster and encouraged his children to achieve science and mathematics excellence. After graduating in electrical engineering from the Tokyo Imperial University, Ito was commissioned in the Imperial Navy and spent several years in assignments at sea.

== At the NTRI ==
Still in the Navy, Yoji Ito was sent to Germany for graduate study where he was a student of Heinrich Barkhausen at the Dresden Technische Hochschule. Upon completing his Doctor of Engineering degree there in 1929, he was promoted to the rank of Commander and assigned as a researcher at the Naval Technology Research Institute (NTRI) in the Meguro area of Tokyo. The NTRI had been formed in 1922, and was just becoming fully operational when Ito was sent there. Here first-rate scientists, engineers, and technicians were engaged in a wide variety of activities for advancing naval capabilities.

At NTRI, Ito became involved with analyzing long-distance radio communications, and wanted to investigate the interaction of microwaves with the Kennelly–Heaviside layer (the ionosphere). He started a project using a Barkhausen–Kurz tube, then tried a split-anode cavity magnetron developed by Kinjiro Okabe at Tohoku University, but the frequency was too unstable. In late 1932, believing that the magnetron would eventually become the primary source for microwave power, he started his own research in this technology, calling the device a magnetic electric tube.

== Partnerships ==
Tsuneo Ito (no relationship to Yoji Ito) at Tokoku University developed an 8-split-anode magnetron that produced about 10 W at 10 cm (3 GHz). Based on its appearance, it was named Tachibana (or Mandarin, an orange citrus fruit). Tsuneo Ito joined the NTRI and continued his research on magnetrons in association with Yoji Ito. In 1937, they developed the technique of coupling adjacent segments (calling it push-pull), resulting in frequency stability, an extremely important magnetron breakthrough.

Shigeru Nakajima, a younger brother of Yoji Ito and a scientist at the Japan Radio Company (JRC), was also investigating magnetrons, primarily for the medical dielectric heating (diathermy) market. An alliance was made between NTRI and JRC for further magnetron development. In early 1939, led by Yoji Ito they built a 10-cm (3-GHz), stable-frequency Mandarin-type magnetron (No. M3) that, with water cooling, could produce 500-W power.

== Magnetron ==
The configuration of the M3 magnetron was essentially the same as that used later in the device developed by Boot and Randall in early 1940, including the improvement of strapped cavities. Unlike the high-power magnetron in Great Britain, however, the initial device from the NTRI generated only a few hundred watts.

During 1940, Yoji Ito suggested that the magnetron be used in a microwave collision-avoidance system, assisting naval vessels to navigate in formation. The NTRI and JRC were funded for a demonstration, with the range (distance) to other vessels determined by frequency-modulating the magnetron. This effort was not successful, but it led to the NTRI attempting to find what the Germans were doing in this area. (Japan had joined Germany and Italy in a Tripartite Pact in 1936.)

== VHF ==
In late 1940. Commander Ito led a technical-exchange mission to Germany. Fluent in the German language and holding a doctorate from Dresden Technische Hochschule, he was well received. Staying several months, he became aware of their pulse-modulated radio equipment for detecting and ranging, and immediately sent word back to Japan that this technology should be incorporated in the NTRI-JRC effort. On August 2, 1941, even before Ito returned to Japan, funds were allocated for the initial development of a pulse-modulated Radio Range Finder (RRF – the Japanese code name for a radar).

The Germans had not yet developed a magnetron suitable for use in such systems, so their equipment operated in the VHF region. At the NTRI, they followed the Germans and built a prototype VHF set operating at 4.2 m (71 MHz) and producing about 5 kW. This was completed on a crash basis, and in early September 1941, the set detected a bomber at a range of 97 km (61 mi). The system, Japan's first full radar, was designated Mark 1 Model 1 and quickly went into production.

=== RRF ===
In parallel with the VHF work, Yoji Ito also returned to the magnetron applications, resulting in Japan's first pulse-modulated microwave RRF set. It operated at 10 cm (3 GHz) and produced a peak-power of 2.0 kW. A prototype was tested in October 1941, and several versions for surface ships and submarines were soon put into production. Naval officials favored the microwave sets because with very narrow beams they were less vulnerable to interception.

== WWII ==
On December 7, 1941, Japan initiated an attack on Pearl Harbor, entering World War II. Yoji Ito was made a department head at the NTRI and was promoted to captain. In the war years, he was responsible for many developments in VHF RRF systems, but was most proud of his microwave equipment. He personally led the development of Japan's first airborne microwave RRF system. This was a 25-cm (1.2-GHz) set producing 2 kW and weighing about 70 kg (150 lb). It was designed for the Gekko night-fighter. He was also involved with Japan's countermeasures equipment, particularly receivers to warn when vessels or aircraft were being observed by American radars.

== Return to magnetrons ==
Development at the NTRI continued on magnetrons, resulting in higher and higher power. Yoji Ito and others eventually came to believe that this device might be used as a weapon, encouraged by an earlier newspaper article telling of Nikola Tesla inventing a beam that would "bring down squadrons of aircraft 250 miles away." In 1943, work began in highest secrecy on a Ku-go (Death Ray) device.

== Laboratory ==
A special laboratory was set up near Shimada, in the Shizuoka Prefecture, for developing a high-power magnetron that, if not as powerful as Tesla had boasted, might at least incapacitate an aircraft. A number of Japan's leading physicists were involved. A 20 cm magnetron producing 100 kW was achieved, and by the end of the war a 1000 kW (1 MW) unit was undergoing preliminary testing. At that time, the development was terminated and the hardware as well as all documentation was destroyed.

== Disbanding of the Japanese military ==
With the surrender of Japan on August 15, 1945, all organizations, facilities, and projects related to the military in Japan were disbanded. Scientists and engineers, as well as military technical officers, engaged in communications and radar formed the base for Japan's future electronics industry. Captain Yoji Ito was among this large group of individuals.

== Koden ==
In 1947, with the hope of making a peaceful contribution of technologies cultivated in his naval days, Dr. Ito founded the Koden Electronics Company Co., Ltd., an affiliate of JRC. Among early products that they conceived was a series of radio direction finders for use in small boat navigation, along with an electronic fish-finder that revolutionized the Japanese commercial fishing industry. Unfortunately, Ito died in 1955, but the firm continues as a worldwide supplier of marine electronic equipment.

== General references ==
- Nakagawa, Yasuzo; Radar and Related Weapons of World War II, translated and edited by Louis Brown, John Bryant, and Naohiko Koizumi, Aegean Park Press, 1997 ISBN 0-89412-271-1
- Swords, S. S.; Technical History of the Beginnings of Radar, Section 4.6, Peter Peregrinus, 1986 ISBN 0-86341-043-X
- Watson, Raymond C., Jr.; Radar Origins Worldwide, Chapter 7, Trafford Publishing, 2009 ISBN 1-4269-2110-1
- Wilkinson, Roger I.; "Short survey of Japanese radar – Part I," Trans. AIEE, Vol. 65, pp. 370–377, 1946
