= John Eugene Kunzler =

American engineer

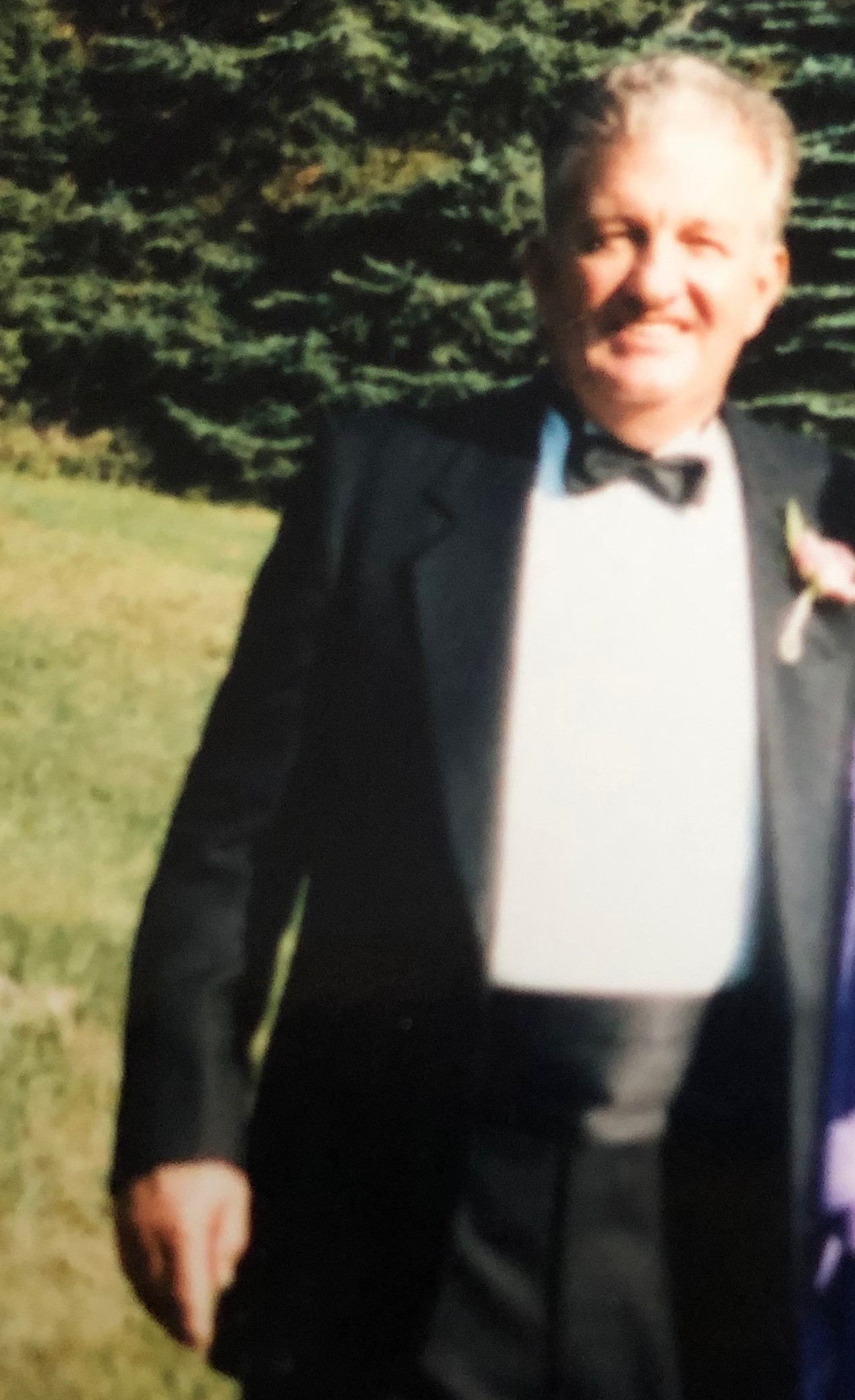
- Born: April 25, 1923; Willard, Utah, United States
- Died: January 11, 2006 (aged 82); Port Murray, New Jersey, United States
- Education: University of California, Berkeley
- Awards: John Price Wetherill Medal; James C. McGroddy Prize
- Scientific career
- Fields: Superconductivity
- Workplaces: Bell Labs

John Eugene Kunzler (April 25, 1923 – January 11, 2006) was an American physicist who conducted pioneering research into the field of superconducting magnets.

== Biography ==
He was born on April 25, 1923, in Willard, Utah, the son of John Jacob Kunzler and Mary Frieda Meier Kunzler. He married Lois McDonald Kunzler on December 29, 1950, and had four daughters (Carol, Marilyn, Bonnie & Kim).

Kunzler earned degrees in physical chemistry at the undergraduate level in 1945 at the University of Utah and earned his doctorate in Chemistry at the University of California, Berkeley in 1950.

A resident of the Port Murray section of Mansfield Township, Warren County, New Jersey, he died on January 11, 2006, at the age of 82.

== Career ==
He has conducted pioneering research into superconducting niobium magnets.

He owned several critical patents in the area of superconducting magnets, including an early patent filed on September 19, 1960.

In 1982, he became the Director of the Future Device Research Center at the AT&T Bell Laboratories.

== Awards and honors ==
- 1962 — Fellow of the American Physical Society
- 1964 — John Price Wetherill Medal (shared with Howard Aiken, John Kenneth Hulm, and Bernd Matthias)
- 1968 - Nominated for the Nobel Prize in Physics
- 1979 — American Physical Society International Prize for New Materials (shared with John Kenneth Hulm and Bernd T. Matthias)

== See also ==
- John Kenneth Hulm
- Niobium
