= James Sayers (physicist) =

Physicist from Northern Ireland

James Sayers (2 September 1912 – 13 March 1993) was a Northern Irish physicist who played a crucial role in developing centimetric radar, which is now used in microwave ovens.

== Early life ==
He was born on a farm in Corkey, County Antrim, Ireland. He built a water wheel to provide the farm with electricity.

He attended Ballymena Academy. He obtained an MSc at Queen's University Belfast, then attended St John's College, Cambridge gaining a PhD.

== Career ==
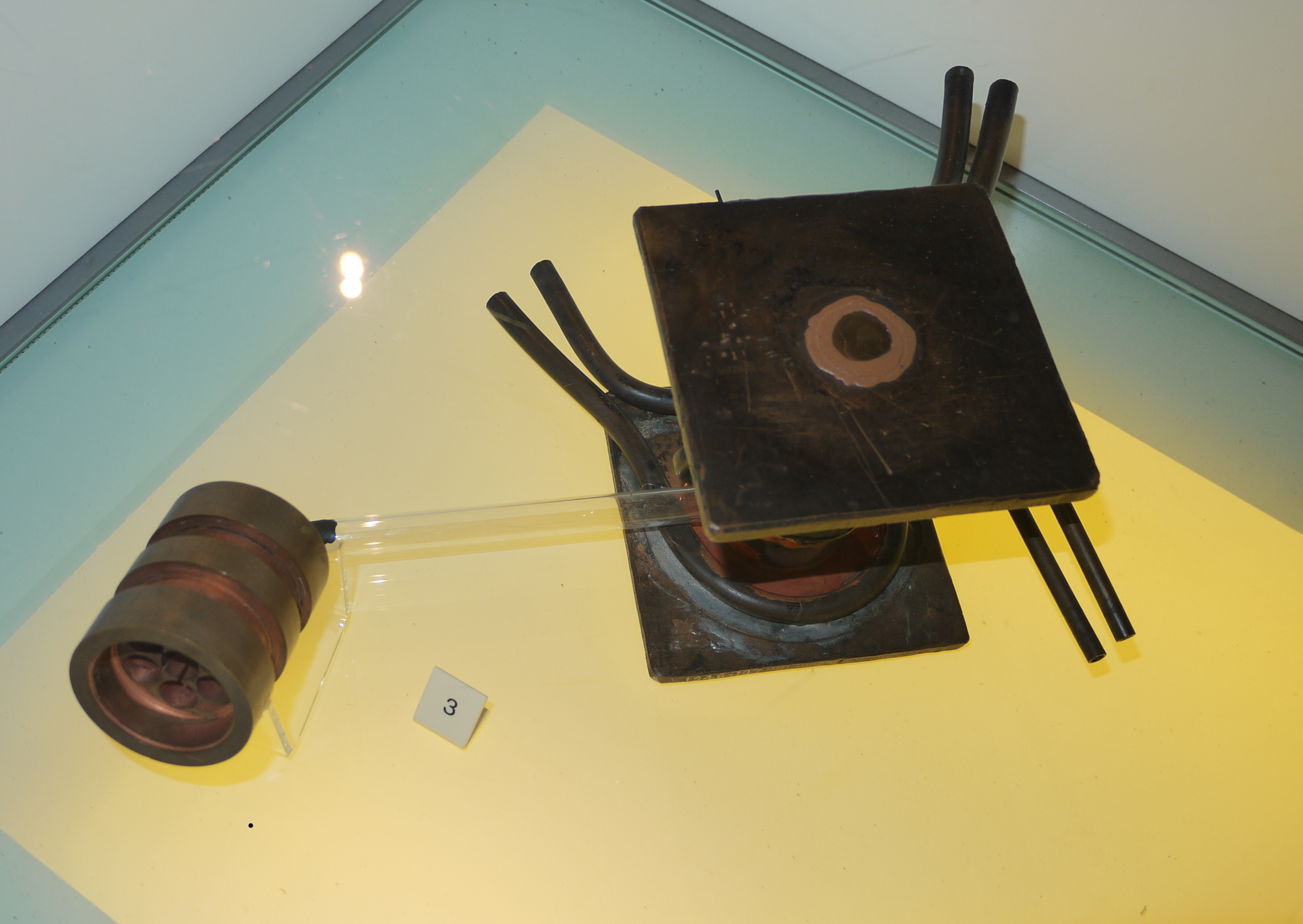
Cavity magnetron at the Science Museum

From 1939 to 1943 he conducted research for the Admiralty at the University of Birmingham on centimetric radar, producing the cavity magnetron. He worked with John Randall and Harry Boot. From 1943 to 1945 he was part of a group of British scientists that worked on the Manhattan Project.

From 1946 until 1972 he was Professor of Electron Physics at the University of Birmingham. Sayers was responsible for electron density experiments using data gathered by the French satellite FR-1 in 1965.

Sayers was President of the Institution of Electronics for 1956/1957 and Immediate Past-President for 1957/1958. In 1958 he received the John Price Wetherill Medal for discoveries in Physical Science.

== Personal life ==
He married Diana Montgomery in 1943. They had two sons and one daughter. He lived at Alvechurch in Worcestershire.

He died on 13 March 1993 aged 80.
