= Wendell F. Moore =

American aeronautical engineer (1918–1969)

Wendell F. Moore (6 March 1918, Canton, Ohio – 29 May 1969) was an American aeronautical engineer, known as a jet pack inventor.

Wendell F. Moore studied aeronautical engineering at Kent State College and Indiana Technical College but seems to have worked as an engineer instead of completing an academic degree. After working for several manufacturers of automotive engines and aircraft accessories, he became in 1945 an engineer at Bell Aerosystems in Wheatfield, New York (part of the Buffalo–Niagara Falls metropolitan area).

Moore first thought about the possibility of a hydrogen-peroxide-powered flying belt in 1953 and talked his superiors at Bell into funding its development. ... Bell knew about the army's interest in individual mobility devices and gave Moore the green light and a small budget with which to work.

In December 1957 Bell Aerospace's team led by Moore began rig testing a jet pack on a tether. In 1959 the U.S. Army's Transportation Research and Engineering Command (TRECOM) issued a Request for Proposal asking for a feasibility study for a "small rocket lift device" for possible use by individual soldiers. In February 1960 Aerojet General submitted its feasibility study (for which it received $56,456). TRECOM then announced a request for proposals to actually build such a device. Bell Aerospace won against Aerojet General and Thiokol. Bell was promised $25,000 of government funding to build an operational prototype and embarked on 10 August 1960 on its program for an operational small rocket lift device.

Moore's team made eighty-eight successful test firings without destroying the test dummy or the test cell with supporting tethers inside a hangar. Moore tested the rocket belt with himself as the pilot on 29 December 1960. He was attached to supporting tethers. There were at least nine other people present, including a medical doctor. On 17 February 1961, after nineteen tethered flights, Moore suffered his major setback when a tether could not support his weight after the rocket motor stopped firing. He fell onto the hangar's concrete floor from a height of about 2.5 meters (eight feet) and shattered one of his kneecaps.

After Moore's mishap, Bell replaced him as rocket belt pilot with Harold "Hal" Graham. After Graham had successfully completed thirty-six tethered flights, Moore and his team took the rocket belt to Niagara Falls International Airport, where on the 20th of April 1961, Graham made his historic flight. He became the first person to complete a successful flight with an untethered rocket belt. The entire flight lasted thirteen seconds and covered 112 feet (34 meters). During the flight Graham's feet were never more than eighteen inches (46 centimeters) off the ground. Three major problems with the jet pack were that it ran out of fuel after 21 seconds, was difficult to pilot, and caused a noise level of about 125 decibels.

In July 1961 Moore submitted his official report to the U.S. Army, which accepted the results and declared the contract terminated. In June 1961 before the contract was terminated, Graham made a demonstration flight in which he flew over an army truck at Fort Eustis. A week later, Graham demonstrated the rocket belt in front of three thousand spectators at the Pentagon. He flew over an army staff car parked on the Pentagon lawn. Shortly afterward, Graham appeared on the television show To Tell the Truth.

On 5 July 1961, Wendell Moore appeared as a contestant on the television show I've Got a Secret. In 1965 he received the John Price Wetherill Medal for the invention of the "small lift rocket device". (Five others also received the Medal in 1965.)

Moore had a wife and children.

== Selected patents ==
- Moore, Wendell F. "Propulsion Unit, U.S. Patent No. 3,021,095, issued February 13, 1962". Washington, DC: U.S. Patent and Trademark Office.
- Moore, Wendell F. "Space belt, U.S. Patent 3,066,887, issued December 4, 1962".
- Moore, Wendell F. "Individual flight device, U.S. Patent 3,149,798, issued September 22, 1964".
