= Voltage doubler =

Electronic circuit that charges capacitors

A voltage doubler is an electronic circuit that charges capacitors from the input voltage and switches these charges in such a way that, in the ideal case, exactly twice the voltage is produced at the output as at its input.

The simplest of these circuits is a form of rectifier which takes an AC voltage as input and outputs a doubled DC voltage. The switching elements are simple diodes, driven to switch state merely by the alternating voltage of the input. DC-to-DC voltage doublers cannot switch in this way and require a driving circuit to control the switching. They frequently also require a switching element that can be controlled directly, such as a transistor, rather than relying on the voltage across the switch as in the simple AC-to-DC case.

Voltage doublers are a variety of voltage multiplier circuits. Many, but not all, voltage doubler circuits can be viewed as a single stage of a higher-order multiplier: cascading identical stages together achieves a greater voltage multiplication.

== Voltage doubling rectifiers ==
=== Villard circuit ===
Figure 1. Villard circuit

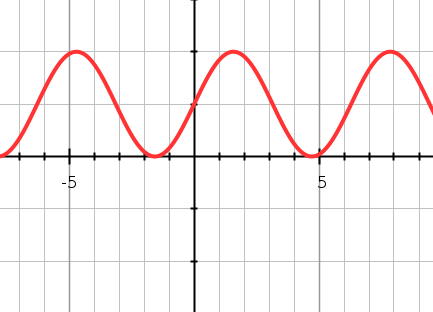
Output voltage of Villard circuit

The Villard circuit, conceived by Paul Ulrich Villard, (Note: Villard, P. (1901), "Transformateur à haut voltage. A survolteur cathodique" [High-voltage transformer. Cathodic voltage booster], Journal de Physique Théorique et Appliquée, 4th series (in French), 10: 28–32, doi:10.1051/jphystap:019010010002801. Villard's voltage booster appears in Fig. 1 on p. 31.) consists simply of a capacitor and a diode. While it has the great benefit of simplicity, its output has very poor ripple characteristics. Essentially, the circuit is a diode clamp circuit. The capacitor is charged on the negative half cycles to the peak AC voltage (V_{pk}). The output is the superposition of the input AC waveform and the steady DC of the capacitor. The effect of the circuit is to shift the DC value of the waveform. The negative peaks of the AC waveform are "clamped" to 0 V (actually −V_{F}, the small forward bias voltage of the diode) by the diode; therefore, the positive peaks of the output waveform are 2V_{pk}. The peak-to-peak ripple is an enormous 2V_{pk} and cannot be smoothed unless the circuit is effectively turned into one of the more sophisticated forms. This is the circuit (with diode reversed) used to supply the negative high voltage for the magnetron in a microwave oven.

=== Greinacher circuit ===
Figure 2. Greinacher circuit

The Greinacher voltage doubler is a significant improvement over the Villard circuit for a small cost in additional components. The ripple is much reduced, nominally zero under open-circuit load conditions, but when current is being drawn depends on the resistance of the load and the value of the capacitors used. The circuit works by following a Villard cell stage with what is in essence a peak detector or envelope detector stage. The peak detector cell has the effect of removing most of the ripple while preserving the peak voltage at the output. The Greinacher circuit is also commonly known as the half-wave voltage doubler.

Figure 3. Voltage quadrupler – two Greinacher cells of opposite polarities

This circuit was first invented by Heinrich Greinacher in 1913 (published 1914 (Note: Greinacher, H. (1914), "Das Ionometer und seine Verwendung zur Messung von Radium- und Röntgenstrahlen" [The ionometer and its application to the measurement of radium- and Röntgen rays], Physikalische Zeitschrift (in German), 15: 410–415. Greinacher's voltage doubler appears in Fig. 4 on p. 412. He used chemical (electrolytic) rectifiers, which are denoted "Z" (Zellen, cells).)) to provide the 200–300 V he needed for his newly invented ionometer, the 110 V AC supplied by the Zürich power stations of the time being insufficient. He later extended this idea into a cascade of multipliers in 1920. (Note: In 1919, a year before Greinacher published his voltage multiplier, the German Moritz Schenkel published a multi-stage voltage multiplier.: Schenkel, Moritz (July 10, 1919), "Eine neue Schaltung für die Erzeugung hoher Gleichspannungen" [A new circuit for the creation of high d.c. voltages], Elektrotechnische Zeitschrift (in German), 40 (28): 333–344; A condensed version of Schenkel's article — with an illustration of the circuit — appeared in: "Eine neue Schaltung für die Erzeugung hoher Gleichspannungen," Polytechnische Schau, 334 : 203-204 (1919). Available on-line at: Polytechnisches Journal.) This cascade of Greinacher cells is often inaccurately referred to as a Villard cascade. It is also called a Cockcroft–Walton multiplier after the particle accelerator machine built by John Cockcroft and Ernest Walton, who independently discovered the circuit in 1932. The concept in this topology can be extended to a voltage quadrupler circuit by using two Greinacher cells of opposite polarities driven from the same AC source. The output is taken across the two individual outputs. As with a bridge circuit, it is impossible to simultaneously ground the input and output of this circuit.

=== Delon circuit ===
Figure 4. Bridge (Delon) voltage doubler

The Delon circuit uses a bridge topology for voltage doubling; (Note: Jules Delon (1876-1941) was an engineer for the French company Société française des câbles électriques Berthoud-Borel. He used a mechanical rectifier, which was based on a rotating commutator (contact tournant).: His apparatus was exhibited at the 1908 Exposition d'électricité in Marseille, France: Georges Tardy (August 15, 1908) "Contact tournant de la Société française des câbles électriques Systeme Berthoud-Borel", L'Electricien: Revue Internationale de l'Electricité et de ses Applications, 2nd series, 36 (920) : 97-98. (Article includes photograph of machine.) The equipment was used to test insulation on high-voltage commercial power lines.; The operation of Delon's bridge rectifier is also explained (with schematic) in: E. von Rziha and Josef Seidener, Starkstromtechnik: Taschenbuch für Elektrotechniker (High-current technology: A Pocket book for Electrical Engineers), 5th ed., vol. 1, (Berlin, Germany: Wilhelm Ernst & Sohn, 1921), pages 710-711.; Delon's name and dates appear in: Friedrich Heilbronner, Internationale Liste von Elektrotechnikern (2013), pp. 14-15. Brief obituary of Jules Delon, Technica (Journal of the Association des anciens eleves de l'ecole centrale Lyonnaise (Association of the Alumni of the Central School of Lyon)), 2nd series, no. 25, page 24 (December 1941). Available on-line at: Technica. See also Delon's U.S. patents no. 1,740,076, no. 1,837,952, and no. 1,995,201.) consequently it is also called a full-wave voltage doubler. This form of circuit was, at one time, commonly found in cathode-ray-tube television sets where it was used to provide an extra high tension (EHT) supply. Generating voltages in excess of 5 kV with a transformer has safety issues in terms of domestic equipment and in any case is uneconomical. However, black and white television sets required an e.h.t. of 10 kV and colour sets even more. Voltage doublers were used to either double the voltage on an e.h.t winding on the mains transformer or were applied to the waveform on the line flyback coils.

The circuit consists of two half-wave peak detectors, functioning in exactly the same way as the peak detector cell in the Greinacher circuit. Each of the two peak detector cells operates on opposite half-cycles of the incoming waveform. Since their outputs are in series, the output is twice the peak input voltage.

== Switched capacitor circuits ==
Figure 5. Switched capacitor voltage doubler achieved by simply switching charged capacitors from parallel to series

It is possible to use the simple diode-capacitor circuits described above to double the voltage of a DC source by preceding the voltage doubler with a chopper circuit. In effect, this converts the DC to AC before application to the voltage doubler. More efficient circuits can be built by driving the switching devices from an external clock so that both functions, the chopping and multiplying, are achieved simultaneously. Such circuits are known as switched capacitor circuits. This approach is especially useful in low-voltage battery-powered applications where integrated circuits (ICs) require a voltage supply greater than the battery can deliver. Frequently, a clock signal is readily available on board the integrated circuit and little or no additional circuitry is needed to generate it.

Conceptually, perhaps the simplest switched capacitor configuration is that shown schematically in figure 5. Here two capacitors are simultaneously charged to the same voltage in parallel. The supply is then switched off and the capacitors are switched into series. The output is taken from across the two capacitors in series resulting in an output double the supply voltage. There are many different switching devices that could be used in such a circuit, but in integrated circuits MOSFET devices are frequently employed.

Figure 6. Charge-pump voltage doubler schematic

Another basic concept is the charge pump, a version of which is shown schematically in figure 6. The charge pump capacitor, C_{P}, is first charged to the input voltage. It is then switched to charging the output capacitor, C_{O}, in series with the input voltage resulting in C_{O} eventually being charged to twice the input voltage. It may take several cycles before the charge pump succeeds in fully charging C_{O} but after steady state has been reached it is only necessary for C_{P} to pump a small amount of charge equivalent to that being supplied to the load from C_{O}. While C_{O} is disconnected from the charge pump it partially discharges into the load resulting in ripple on the output voltage. This ripple is smaller for higher clock frequencies since the discharge time is shorter, and is also easier to filter. Alternatively, the capacitors can be made smaller for a given ripple specification. The practical maximum clock frequency in integrated circuits is typically in the hundreds of kilohertz.

=== Dickson charge pump ===
Figure 7. Dickson charge-pump voltage-doubler

The Dickson charge pump, or Dickson multiplier, consists of a cascade of diode/capacitor cells with the bottom plate of each capacitor driven by a clock pulse train. The circuit is a modification of the Cockcroft–Walton multiplier but takes a DC input with the clock trains providing the switching signal instead of the AC input. The Dickson multiplier normally requires that alternate cells are driven from clock pulses of opposite phase. However, since a voltage doubler, shown in figure 7, requires only one stage of multiplication only one clock signal is required.

The Dickson multiplier is frequently employed in ICs where the supply voltage (from a battery for instance) is lower than that required by the circuitry. Because IC designers and manufacturers benefit from using the same technology and basic device throughout a chip, CMOS Dickson multipliers often wire MOSFETs to behave as diodes (e.g. Figure 8).

Figure 8. Dickson voltage doubler using diode-wired n-type MOSFETs

There are many variations and improvements to the basic Dickson charge pump. Many of these are concerned with reducing the effect of the transistor drain-source voltage. This can be very significant if the input voltage is small, such as a low-voltage battery. With ideal switching elements the output is an integral multiple of the input (two for a doubler) but with a single-cell battery as the input source and MOSFET switches the output will be far less than this value since much of the voltage will be dropped across the transistors. For a circuit using discrete components the Schottky diode would be a better choice of switching element for its extremely low voltage drop in the on state. However, integrated circuit designers prefer to use the easily available MOSFET and compensate for its inadequacies with increased circuit complexity.

As an example, an alkaline battery cell has a nominal voltage of 1.5 V. A voltage doubler using ideal switching elements with zero voltage drop will hypothetically double this to 3.0 V. However, the drain-source voltage drop of a diode-wired MOSFET when it is in the on state must be at least the gate threshold voltage which might typically be 0.9 V. This voltage "doubler" will only succeed in raising the output voltage by about 0.6 V to 2.1 V. If the drop across the final smoothing transistor is also taken into account the circuit may not be able to increase the voltage at all without using multiple stages. A typical Schottky diode, on the other hand, might have an on state voltage of 0.3 V. A doubler using this Schottky diode will result in a voltage of 2.7 V, or at the output after the smoothing diode, 2.4 V.

=== Cross-coupled switched capacitors ===
Figure 9. Cross-coupled switched-capacitor voltage doubler

Cross-coupled switched capacitor circuits come into their own for very low input voltages. Wireless battery-driven equipment such as pagers, Bluetooth devices and the like may require a single-cell battery to continue to supply power when it has discharged to under a volt.

When clock $\phi_1$ is low, transistor Q_{2} is turned off. At the same time, clock $\phi_2$ is high. This turns on transistor Q_{1}, which results in capacitor C_{1} being charged to V_{in}. When $\phi_1$ goes high, the top plate of C_{1} is pushed up to twice V_{in}. At the same time, switch S_{1} closes, so this voltage appears at the output. At the same time, Q_{2} is turned on allowing C_{2} to charge. On the next half cycle the roles will be reversed: $\phi_1$ will be low, $\phi_2$ will be high, S_{1} will open and S_{2} will close. Thus, the output is supplied with 2V_{in} alternately from each side of the circuit.

The loss is low in this circuit because there are no diode-wired MOSFETs and their associated threshold voltage problems. The circuit also has the advantage that the ripple frequency is doubled because there are effectively two voltage doublers both supplying the output from out of phase clocks. The primary disadvantage of this circuit is that stray capacitances are much more significant than with the Dickson multiplier and account for the larger part of the losses in this circuit.

== See also ==
- Boost converter
- Buck–boost converter
- DC to DC converter
- Flyback converter

== Bibliography ==
- Ahmed, Syed Imran Pipelined ADC Design and Enhancement Techniques, Springer, 2010 ISBN 90-481-8651-X.
- Bassett, R. J.; Taylor, P. D. (2003), "17. Power Semiconductor Devices", Electrical Engineer's Reference Book, Newnes, pp. 17/1–17/37, ISBN 0-7506-4637-3
- Campardo, Giovanni; Micheloni, Rino; Novosel, David VLSI-design of Non-volatile Memories, Springer, 2005 ISBN 3-540-20198-X.
- Kind, Dieter; Feser, Kurt (2001), translator Y. Narayana Rao (ed.), High-voltage Test Techniques, Newnes, ISBN 0-7506-5183-0
- Kories, Ralf; Schmidt-Walter, Heinz Taschenbuch der Elektrotechnik: Grundlagen und Elektronik, Deutsch Harri GmbH, 2004 ISBN 3-8171-1734-5.
- Liou, Juin J.; Ortiz-Conde, Adelmo; García-Sánchez, F. Analysis and Design of MOSFETs, Springer, 1998 ISBN 0-412-14601-0.
- Liu, Mingliang (2006), Demystifying Switched Capacitor Circuits, Newnes, ISBN 0-7506-7907-7
- McComb, Gordon Gordon McComb's gadgeteer's goldmine!, McGraw-Hill Professional, 1990 ISBN 0-8306-3360-X.
- Mehra, J; Rechenberg, H The Historical Development of Quantum Theory, Springer, 2001 ISBN 0-387-95179-2.
- Millman, Jacob; Halkias, Christos C. Integrated Electronics, McGraw-Hill Kogakusha, 1972 ISBN 0-07-042315-6.
- Peluso, Vincenzo; Steyaert, Michiel; Sansen, Willy M. C. Design of Low-voltage Low-power CMOS Delta-Sigma A/D Converters, Springer, 1999 ISBN 0-7923-8417-2.
- Ryder, J. D. (1970), Electronic Fundamentals & Applications, Pitman Publishing, ISBN 0-273-31491-2
- Wharton, W.; Howorth, D. Principles of Television Reception, Pitman Publishing, 1971 ISBN 0-273-36103-1.
- Yuan, Fei CMOS Circuits for Passive Wireless Microsystems, Springer, 2010 ISBN 1-4419-7679-5.
- Zumbahlen, Hank Linear Circuit Design Handbook, Newnes, 2008 ISBN 0-7506-8703-7.
