= John Kenneth Hulm =

British-American physicist

John Kenneth Hulm (4 July 1923, Southport, UK – 16 January 2004) was a British-American physicist and engineer, known for the development of superconducting materials with applications to high-field superconducting magnets. In 1953 with George F. Hardy he discovered the first A-15 superconducting alloy.

John K. Hulm received his undergraduate degree in 1943 from the University of Cambridge and then worked on radar development until the end of WWII. After the war he returned to Cambridge and received his PhD in 1949 with a thesis on the thermal conductivity of superconductors. His thesis advisor was David Shoenberg. At the University of Chicago, Hulm was a postdoc from 1949 to 1951 and an assistant professor from 1951 to 1954.

His highly productive research work there resulted in the discovery, with George Hardy, of the A-15 superconducting alloys, binary compounds of elements that exhibited superconductivity at temperatures as high as 17 degrees Kelvin. Together with B. T. Matthias, John published 14 technical papers based on his work in Chicago.

In 1954 he became employed at the Westinghouse Electric Corporation research laboratory in Pittsburgh. There he assembled and led a research team dealing with the physics of materials, especially superconductors. He was promoted in 1956 to manager of the lab’s Solid State Physics Department and in 1960 to associate director, Material Science, with several departments under his management. He spent the rest of his working career at Westinghouse.

John and his team scored a major breakthrough in 1961 with the discovery that a niobium-tin alloy maintained its zero resistance under magnetic fields as high as 10 tesla, far above the saturation point of iron. Alloys of this type, including niobium-titanium, are called Type II superconductors. When these alloys were properly fabricated into wire, they could sustain currents on the order of 10,000 amperes, thus opening the possibility of producing magnetic fields higher than any achieved before.

In the 1960s Hulm took on more managerial and engineering duties. For the two years 1974 and 1975 on a leave of absence from Westinghouse, he was the science attaché at the U.S. Embassy in London. He returned to Westinghouse as manager of the Chemical Sciences Department. In the 1980s he was director of corporate research and R&D planning. He retired in 1988. In 1989 he accompanied Mildred Dresselhaus to Japan to evaluate that country’s superconductivity research. During his career he was the author or co-author of about 100 scientific papers.

In 1948 Hulm married Joan Askham. Upon his death he was survived by his widow, four daughters, a son, and six grandchildren.

== Awards and honours ==
- 1964 — John Price Wetherill Medal (shared with Howard Aiken, John Eugene Kunzler, and Bernd Matthias)
- 1979 — American Physical Society International Prize for New Materials (shared with John Eugene Kunzler and Bernd T. Matthias)
- 1980 — Member of the National Academy of Engineering
- 1988 — Member of the National Academy of Sciences

== Selected publications ==
- Hulm, J. K. (1950). "The thermal conductivity of tin, mercury, indium and tantalum at liquid helium temperatures". Proceedings of the Royal Society of London. Series A. Mathematical and Physical Sciences. 204 (1076): 98–123. Bibcode:1950RSPSA.204...98H. doi:10.1098/rspa.1950.0164.
- Gomer, Robert; Hulm, J. K. (1957). "Adsorption and Diffusion of Oxygen on Tungsten". The Journal of Chemical Physics. 27 (6): 1363–1376. Bibcode:1957JChPh..27.1363G. doi:10.1063/1.1744008.
- Hulm, J. K.; Goodman, B. B. (1957). "Superconducting Properties of Rhenium, Ruthenium, and Osmium". Physical Review. 106 (4): 659–671. Bibcode:1957PhRv..106..659H. doi:10.1103/PhysRev.106.659.
- Chandrasekhar, B.S.; Hulm, J.K. (1958). "The electrical resistivity and super-conductivity of some uranium alloys and compounds". Journal of Physics and Chemistry of Solids. 7 (2–3): 259–267. Bibcode:1958JPCS....7..259C. doi:10.1016/0022-3697(58)90271-3.
- Blaugher, R.D.; Hulm, J.K. (1961). "Superconductivity in the σ and α-Mn structures". Journal of Physics and Chemistry of Solids. 19 (1–2): 134–138. Bibcode:1961JPCS...19..134B. doi:10.1016/0022-3697(61)90067-1.
- Coffey, H. T.; Hulm, J. K.; Reynolds, W. T.; Fox, D. K.; Span, R. E. (1965). "A Protected 100‐kG Superconducting Magnet". Journal of Applied Physics. 36 (1): 128–136. Bibcode:1965JAP....36..128C. doi:10.1063/1.1713858.
- Pessall, N.; Hulm, J. K. (1966). "Superconducting alloys of interstitial compounds". Physics Physique Fizika. 2 (6): 311–328. doi:10.1103/PhysicsPhysiqueFizika.2.311.
- Doyle, N.J.; Hulm, J.K.; Jones, C.K.; Miller, R.C.; Taylor, A. (1968). "Vacancies and superconductivity in titanium monoxide". Physics Letters A. 26 (12): 604–605. Bibcode:1968PhLA...26..604D. doi:10.1016/0375-9601(68)90146-1.
- Deis, D. W.; Gavaler, J. R.; Hulm, J. K.; Jones, C. K. (1969). "High Field Properties of Pure Niobium Nitride Thin Films". Journal of Applied Physics. 40 (5): 2153–2156. Bibcode:1969JAP....40.2153D. doi:10.1063/1.1657941.
- Hulm, J. K.; Jones, C. K.; Hein, R. A.; Gibson, J. W. (1972). "Superconductivity in the TiO and NbO systems". Journal of Low Temperature Physics. 7 (3–4): 291–307. Bibcode:1972JLTP....7..291H. doi:10.1007/BF00660068.
