= Heinrich Greinacher =

Swiss physicist

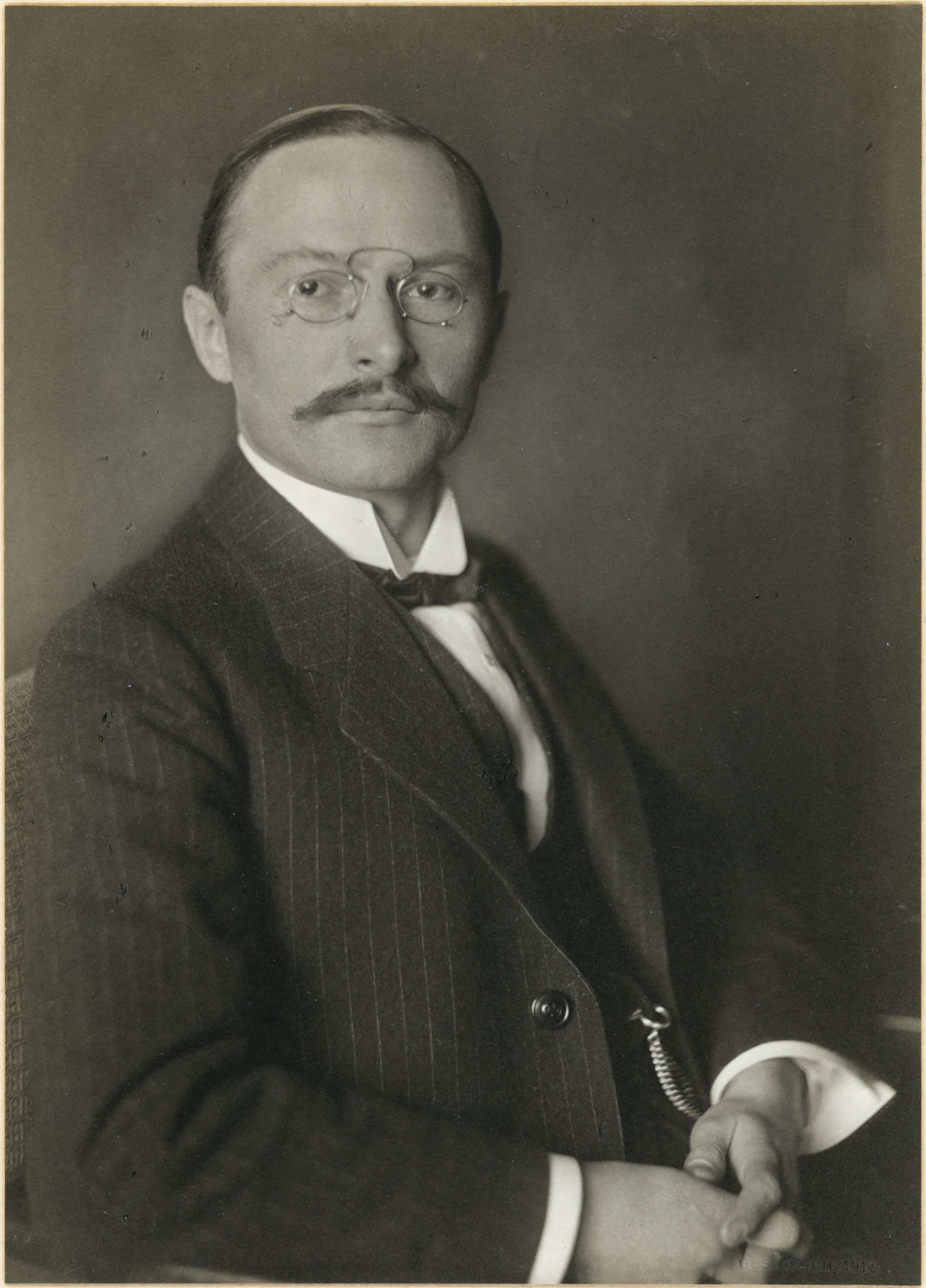
- Heinrich Greinacher, 1914
- Born: May 31, 1880
- Died: April 17, 1974 (aged 93)
- Occupation: Physicist
- Known for: Greinacher circuit Greinacher multiplier Ionometer; Magnetron
- Children: 2

Heinrich Greinacher (May 31, 1880 in St. Gallen – April 17, 1974 in Bern) was a Swiss physicist. He is regarded as an original experimenter and is the developer of the magnetron and the Greinacher multiplier.

Greinacher was the only child of master shoemaker Heinrich Greinacher and his wife Pauline, born Münzenmayer. He went to school in St. Gallen and studied physics at both Zurich, Geneva and Berlin. He also trained as a pianist at the Geneva Conservatory of Music. Originally a German citizen, he was naturalized in 1894 as a Swiss citizen. In Berlin, Greinacher attended the lectures of Max Planck and received a doctorate in 1904 under Emil Warburg. He did his habilitation in 1907 at the University of Zurich, and in 1912, he moved to Zurich on a permanent basis. From 1924 to 1952, he was full professor of Experimental Physics at the University of Bern and the director of the Physical Institute (formerly Physics Cabinett).

In 1912, Greinacher developed the magnetron and gave a fundamental mathematical description of this tube. In 1914, he invented the Greinacher circuit (a rectifier circuit for voltage doubling). In 1919, he generalized this idea to a cascaded voltage multiplier, and developed detection methods for charged particles (proportional counter, spark counter). In the 1930s, using an independently invented Greinacher-style multiplier to research atomic nuclei, British researchers Cockroft and Walton discovered artificial radioactivity.

Greinacher was married twice: in 1910 to the German Marie Mahlmann, with whom he had two children, and then again in 1933 to Frieda Urben from Inkwil.

== Foundation ==
A foundation was established in Bern in 1988 with the name of Heinrich-Greinacher-Stiftung from the estate of the couple Frieda and Heinrich Greinacher. Interest income of the Foundation's capital is used to fund the Heinrich Greinacher Prize and for the promotion of young researchers and scientists.

== Publications ==
- Negotiations of the Swiss Society of Natural Sciences. Issue 154 (1974), p. 239-251 (with a catalog)
- Hans Erich Hollmann:physics and technology of the ultra-waves. Volume 1 Production ultrakurzwelliger oscillations.
