= Seetakt =

German naval radar during WWII

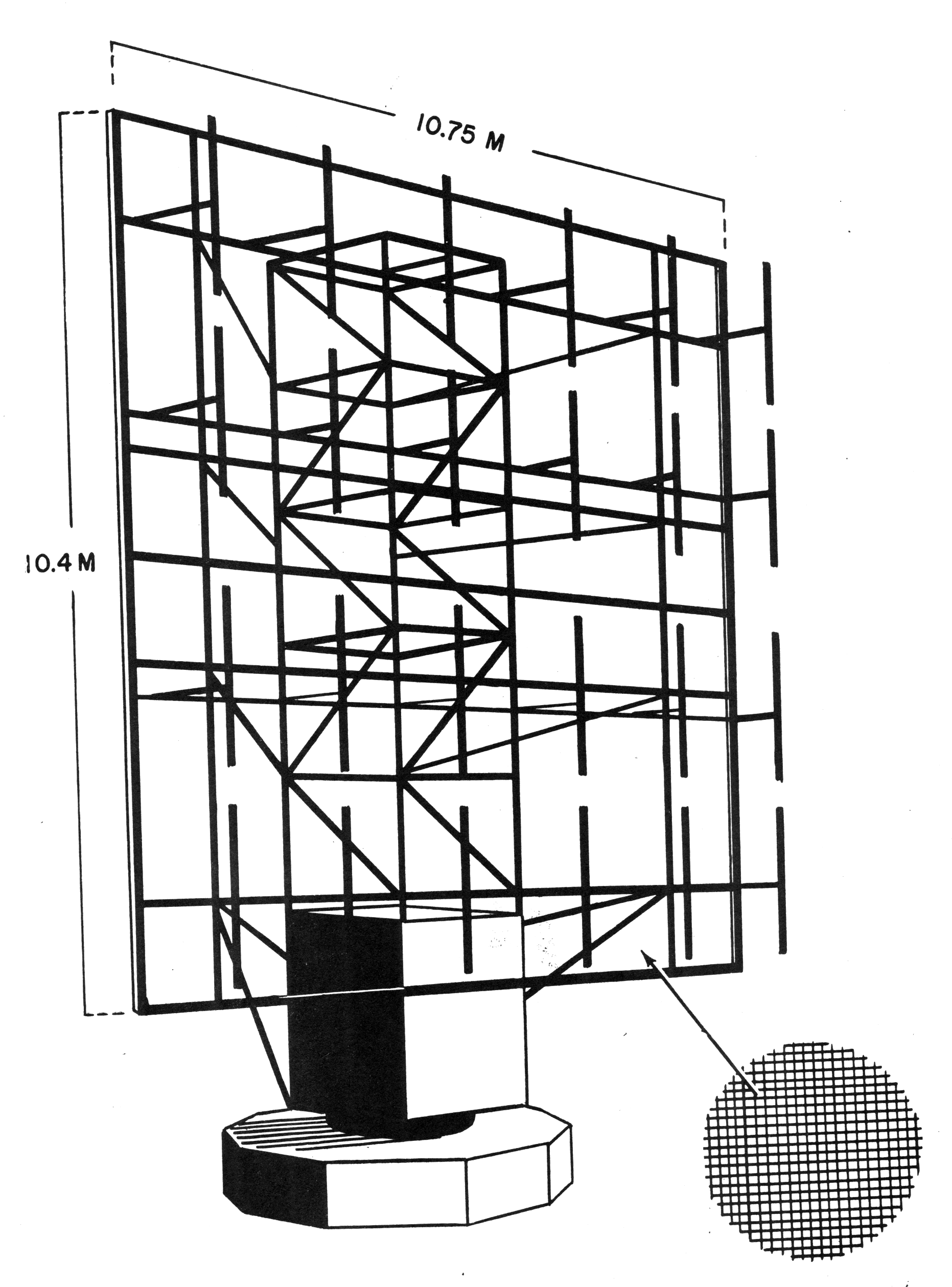
- Country of origin: Germany
- Introduced: 1936
- Type: Naval surface search
- Frequency: 368 MHz/81.5 cm
- Range: 6–10 nautical miles (11–19 km; 6.9–11.5 mi)
- Power: 7 kW

Seetakt was a shipborne radar developed in the 1930s and used by the German Navy (Kriegsmarine) during World War II. It is the first naval radar to enter service, and among the earliest radars of any sort. It provided range measurements with an accuracy on the order of 50 metres (160 ft), more than enough for gunnery. Its angle accuracy was not very good, but the development of lobe switching specifically for this radar provided about 1 degree accuracy, not enough to directly lay the guns, but still useful for initial plotting and aiding the optical spotters find their target.

== Development ==
In Germany during the late 1920s, Hans Hollmann began working in the field of microwave frequencies, which later were used by almost all radar systems. In 1935 he published Physics and Technique of Ultrashort Waves, which was picked up by researchers around the world. At the time he had been most interested in their use for communications, but he and his partner Hans-Karl von Willisen had also worked on radar-like systems.

In 1928 Hollmann, von Willisen and Paul-Günther Erbslöh started a company Gesellschaft für elektroakustische und mechanische Apparate (GEMA). In the autumn of 1934 GEMA built the first commercial radar system for detecting ships, similar to a system developed by Christian Hülsmeyer. Operating in the 50 cm range, it could detect ships up to 10 km away. This early version of the system only provided a warning that a ship was in the general vicinity of the direction the antenna was pointed, without accurate direction or any sort of range information. The purpose was to provide an anti-collision system at night, in fog, and other times of limited visibility.

By order of the German navy, in the summer of 1935 they developed a pulse radar with which they could spot the cruiser Königsberg at a distance of 8 km, with an accuracy of up to 50 m, enough for gun-laying. The same system could also detect an aircraft at 500 m altitude at a distance of 28 km. The military implications were not lost this time around, and construction of land and sea-based versions took place as Freya radar and Seetakt. The navy's priority at that time was ranging; detecting targets and obstacles by night or in bad weather was a secondary objective. Actually using it for gun laying, like the Würzburg radar developed for the German army, was initially not a priority for the Kriegsmarine.

The two systems were generally similar, although the early Seetakt systems worked on a 50 cm wavelength (600 MHz), while Freya was designed for much longer ranges and used a 2.4 m wavelength that could be generated at high power using existing electronics.

These early systems proved problematic, and a new version using improved electronics at 60 cm wavelength (500 MHz) was introduced. Four units were ordered and installed on the Königsberg, Admiral Graf Spee and two large torpedo boats (which in German service were the size of small destroyers). The Admiral Graf Spee used this unit successfully against shipping in the Atlantic. In December 1939, after heavy fighting during the Battle of the River Plate, the Admiral Graf Spee was severely damaged and the captain scuttled the ship in the neutral harbor off Montevideo, Uruguay. The ship sank in shallow water, with her radar antenna visible.

These early-model Seetakt systems were followed in 1939 by a modified version known as Dete 1, operating between 71 and 81.5 cm wavelength (368 to 390 MHz) at 8 kW peak and a pulse repetition frequency of 500 Hz. Maximum range against a ship-sized target at sea was up to 22.0 kilometers (13.7 mi) on a good day, although more typically half that. Performance was otherwise similar to the earlier system, with a range accuracy of about 50 m. This was better than guns, which typically had spreads of over 100 m between rounds. It was also much better than the optical rangefinding equipment of the era, which would typically be accurate to about 200 m at 20,000 m. However, some German optical rangefinders were reportedly capable of 40-50 m accuracy at that range, which helps to explain why the Germans continued to rely on optics as their primary maritime range-finding equipment for several years into the war.

== Bibliography ==
- Friedman, Norman (1981). Naval Radar. London: Conway Maritime Press. ISBN 0-85177-238-2.
