= Hans Hollmann =

Hans Erich (Eric) Hollmann (4 November 1899 – 19 November 1960) was a German-American electronic specialist who made several breakthroughs in the development of radar.

Hollmann was born in Solingen, Germany. He became interested in radio and even as a teenager subscribed to the technical magazines of the day. Late in World War I he became a prisoner of war of the French and did not return to Germany until 1920. He then studied at the Technische Hochschule in Darmstadt (now Technische Universität Darmstadt) until he received his doctorate in 1928.

Hollmann's doctoral research included the development of an ultra-short-wave transmitter and receiver for centimetre and decimetre waves. This gained the attention of Telefunken, and ultimately led to their development of the first microwave telecommunication system.

In 1930 Hollmann moved to the Heinrich-Hertz Institute for Oscillatory Research in Berlin. There he continued studies in microwaves and cathode ray tubes and also worked on the ionosphere research and radio astronomy. In 1933 Hollmann became a lecturer at the Technische Hochschule in Charlottenburg (now Technische Universität Berlin).

In January 1934, Hans-Karl von Willisen and Paul-Günther Erbslöh started a company called Gesellschaft für elektroakustische und mechanische Apparate (GEMA). With Hollmann as a consultant, GEMA built a system using interference detection in the autumn of 1934. It operated at 50 cm wavelength and could detect ships up to 10 km distance. By 1935, they used pulse-modulation, allowing measurement of range (distance to the target), and developed the technology into two applications. For naval use, the Seetakt system used a wavelength of 80 cm. A land based version at 120 cm wavelength was also developed as Freya.

Telefunken set up a radar business in 1933 based on Hollmann's work and developed a much shorter-range gun-laying system called Würzburg. During World War II, Freya and Würzburg worked in pairs. Freya would spot the incoming aircraft while the Würzburg calculated the distance and height.

He invented and patented a prototype of the cavity magnetron in 1935, but the German military considered the frequency drift of Hollman's device to be undesirable, and based their radar systems on the klystron instead.

In the same year, Hollmann wrote two books on microwaves, Physics and Technique of Ultra-short Waves and Seeing with Electromagnetic Waves, which were the inspiration for the development of centimetre radar in other countries despite some censorship of their contents.

During the war he supervised many research institutes in occupied countries and saved many scientists from being deported to Germany. He established the Laboratory for High-Frequency Engineering and Ultrasound in Lichterfelde, Berlin. Part of their work involved making transmitters for the Navy. Here he brought in Max Bense. At this time there was speculation about a future possibility of teleporting human beings from Germany to California. His home and his laboratory were destroyed during the war. After the war he was not allowed to work on microwaves but he turned his attention to a wide range of other fields in electronics.

In 1947 he accepted an offer from the US Government to work for NASA in California. In 1949 he sent Bense a copy of Norbert Wiener's Cybernetics: Or Control and Communication in the Animal and the Machine (1948), stimulating the latter's interest in cybernetics.

He was married to Gisela Schimmelbusch and had three children. He died in Los Angeles in 1960.
