= Ionometer =

The term ionometer was originally applied to a device for measuring the intensity of ionising radiation. Examples of radiation detectors described as ionometers can be found through to the 1950s but the term more often now means a device for measuring the chemical ion concentration of a fluid.

== Ionometer (radiation) ==
An early ionometer is due to the Swiss physicist Heinrich Greinacher in 1913. However, Greinacher was not the first to build an ionometer, he credits one Bronson with building an instrument upon which Greinacher's was an improvement. Greinacher states the advantage of his instrument over Bronson's being in not requiring the quadrant electrometer (invented by Lord Kelvin).

Greinacher also had to invent the practical voltage doubler circuit in order to provide the 200-300 V he needed for the ionometer as the 110 V AC supplied by the Zurich power stations of the time were insufficient.

== Ionometer (ion concentration) ==
Possibly the first use of ionometer with this meaning was by F. E. Bartell. In his paper on the instrument in 1917 he discusses possible names, rejecting potentiometer as inappropriate, so implying that there was not already a name in existence.
