= Harry Boot =

English physicist (1917–1983)

- Born: 29 July 1917; Birmingham
- Died: 8 February 1983 (aged 65)
- Education: University of Birmingham
- Known for: cavity magnetron
- Scientific career
- Fields: physics
- Doctoral advisor: Mark Oliphant

Henry Albert Howard Boot (29 July 1917 – 8 February 1983) was an English physicist who with Sir John Randall and James Sayers developed the cavity magnetron, which was one of the keys to the Allied victory in the Second World War.

== Biography ==
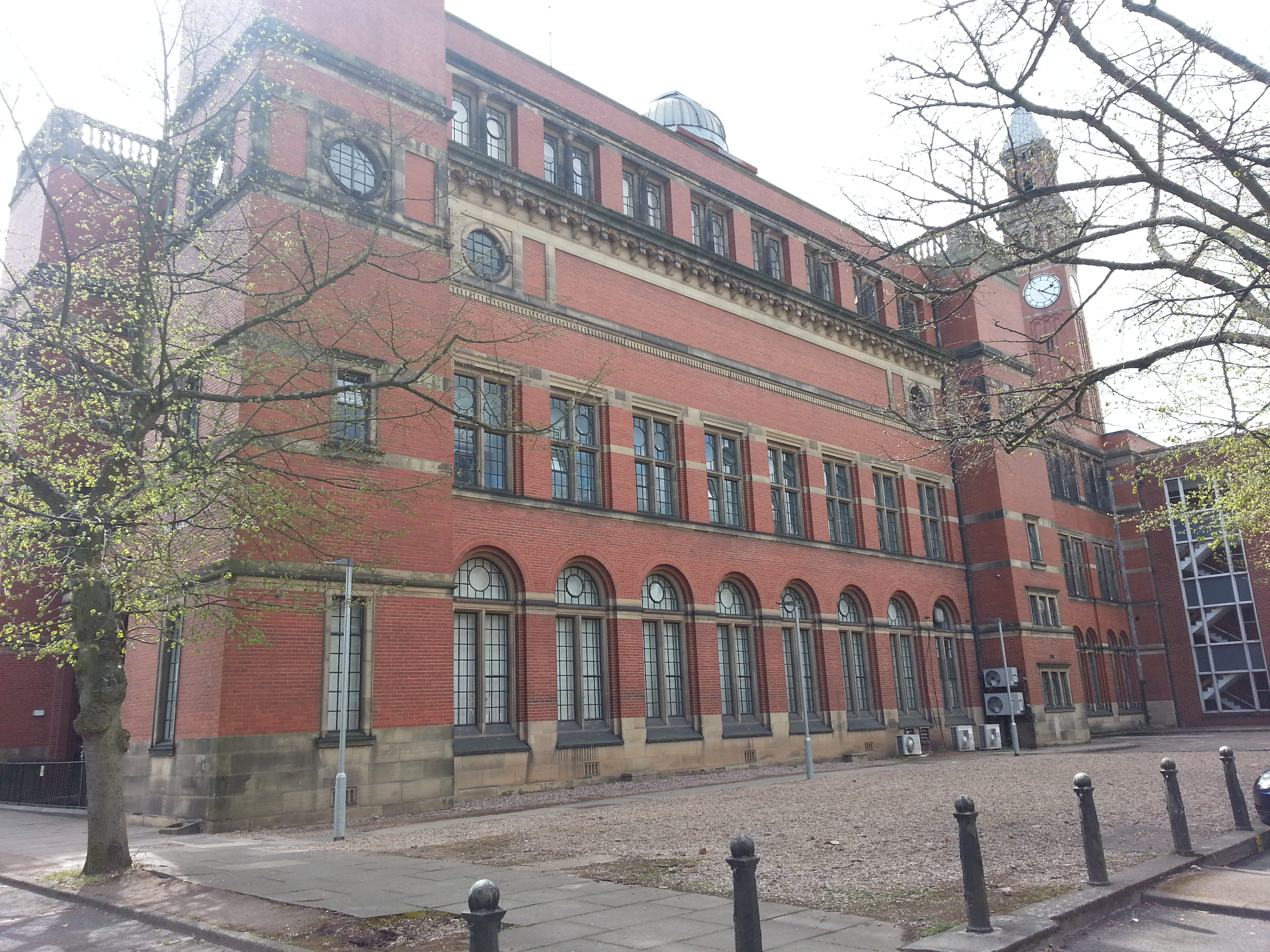
Poynting Physics Building, Birmingham University

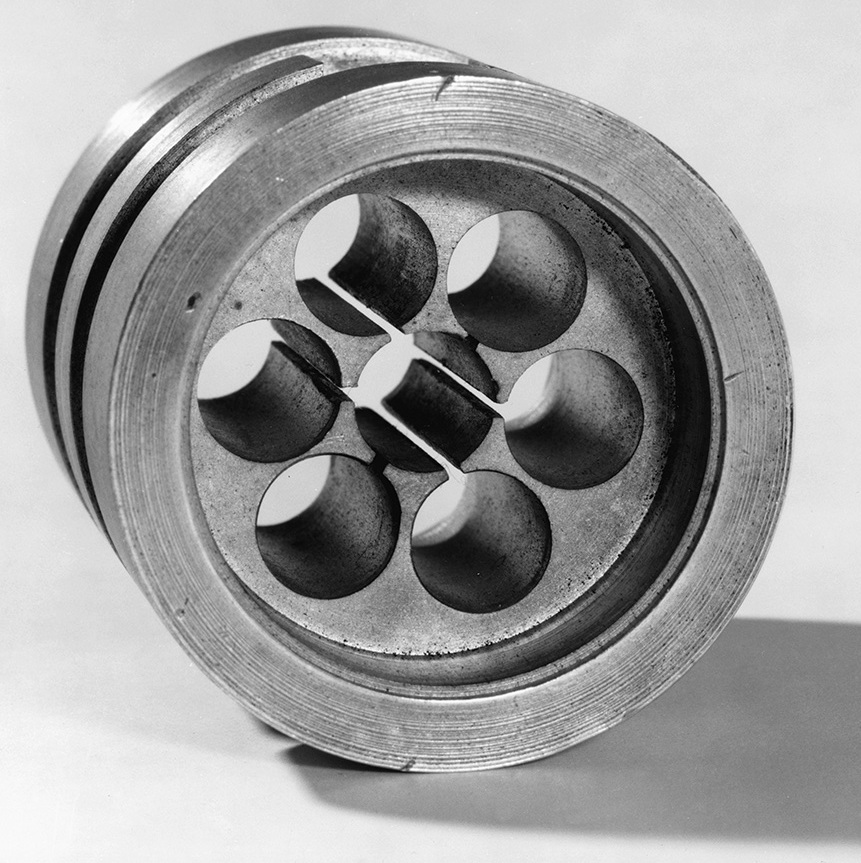
An original six-cavity magnetron.

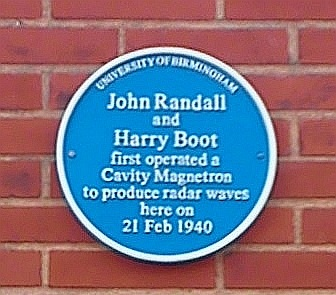
University of Birmingham – Poynting Physics Building – blue plaque

Henry Boot was born in Birmingham and attended King Edward's School, Birmingham and the University of Birmingham. While working on his PhD the war broke out. His professor Mark Oliphant had seen the klystron at Stanford University but it produced insufficient power to be useful as a radar transmitter. He assigned John Randall and Boot to the problem. By late February 1940, they had invented the much more powerful cavity magnetron which was fitted in an experimental radar by May 1940.

James Sayers later refined the magnetron still further by strapping alternate cavities. As with many British inventions of this period, the magnetron was provided to the US for free when they entered World War II. Initially Boot and Randall were awarded £50 each for the magnetron for "improving the safety of life at sea", but in 1949 Boot, Randall and Sayers received a £36,000 prize for their work.

After a brief time at British Thomson-Houston, Rugby, in the latter years of the war, Boot returned to Birmingham as the Nuffield Research Fellow. After some work on nuclear physics, Boot returned to magnetrons and after the war built a cyclotron at Birmingham.

In 1948 he joined the Scientific Civil Service, and was appointed Principal Scientific Officer (PSO) at Services Electronic Research Laboratories, in Baldock in Hertfordshire, where he undertook research on microwaves, magnetrons, plasma physics and lasers.

He enjoyed sailing, owning two boats at Salcombe in Devon. He frequently went down there to the family holiday home with his wife Penelope, and his two sons, Christopher and Nicholas.

He retired in 1977 and died in Cambridge on 8 February 1983.
