= Alan Fowler (physicist) =

American physicist (1928–2024)

Alan Bicksler Fowler
- Born: October 15, 1928; Denver, Colorado, U.S.
- Died: August 4, 2024 (aged 95); Pittsburgh, Pennsylvania, U.S.
- Education: Rensselaer Polytechnic Institute (BS, MS), Harvard University (PhD)
- Awards: Oliver E. Buckley Condensed Matter Prize (1988)
- Scientific career
- Fields: Physics

Alan Bicksler Fowler (October 15, 1928 – August 4, 2024) was an American physicist.

== Life and education ==
He was born in Denver, Colorado on October 15, 1928. Fowler served in the U.S. Army from 1946 to 1948 and from 1952 to 1953.

He earned a BS in 1951, then an MS in 1952 from Rensselaer Polytechnic Institute in Troy, New York. In 1958, he earned his PhD from Harvard University.

Fowler was married to Kathleen Devlin for 65 years, until her death in 2016, with whom he had two sons and two daughters. He is a member of the National Academy of Sciences.

Fowler died on August 4, 2024, at the age of 95 in Pittsburgh, Pennsylvania.

== Career ==
He worked as a researcher for Raytheon Technologies, from 1953 to 1956, and for IBM Thomas J. Watson Research Center from 1958 to 1993, and was a member of the IBM MOS research group.

He is an IBM Fellow Emeritus.

Fowler is named as a co-inventor in nine U.S. Patents.

Fowler was awarded the Oliver E. Buckley Condensed Matter Prize by the American Physical Society in 1988.
