= Montreal flood of 1987 =

Floods in Montreal, Canada in 1987

- Décarie expressway flooded.
- Date: July 14, 1987
- Location: Montreal Island
- Deaths: 2
- Property damage: 220 million $CAN of 1987 (527 million now)

The Montreal flood of 1987 happened on July 14 of that year when a series of strong thunderstorms crossed the island of Montreal, Quebec, Canada, between the noon hour and 2:30 p.m. Over 100 millimetres (3.9 in) of rain fell during this very short period of time. The sewer systems were overwhelmed by the deluge and the city was paralyzed by the flooded roads. Autoroute 15, a sunken highway also known as the Décarie Expressway, soon filled with water, trapping motorists. Some 350,000 houses lost electricity, and tens of thousands had flooded basements. Two people died, one in a submerged car and another who was electrocuted.

== Meteorological situation ==
A heat wave had been affecting the province of Quebec, Canada, for over a week. Temperatures in the air mass were reaching 35 °C (95 °F) and the dew points were around 25 °C (77 °F), both exceptionally high for Southern Quebec. During the evening of July 13, a northeast to southwest cold front approached the Montreal region from Ontario and triggered isolated severe thunderstorms.

=== Initial analysis ===
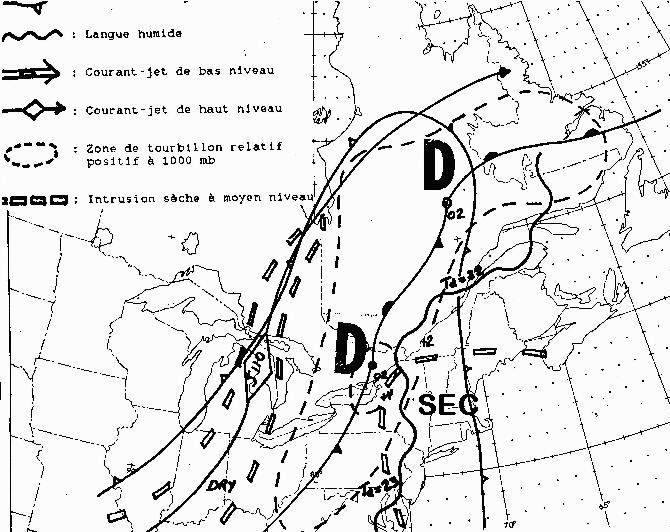
Weather map showing the meteorological features responsible for triggering the severe outbreak on the morning of July 14, 1987

The map on the left shows the meteorological situation at 1200 UTC of the morning of July 14, 1987 (0800 local). The cold front at the border between Ontario and Quebec is supported by an intensifying barometric trough at 500 mb, and a low pressure is developing at the surface, just southwest of Ottawa, Ontario. Cumulonimbus with high tops were easily forming in the moist, humid and unstable air mass near the ground while drier air was cooling the air in the mid-tropospheric levels. A wind divergence at the upper level and a convergence near the surface, due to the low pressure, was helping to organize the deep convection.

Evaluation of the nearby upper air station tephigram showed a very strong convective available potential energy (CAPE) and the hodograph had a strong wind shear in the first 4 kilometres (13,000 ft) above ground, conducive to rotation in the convective clouds, hail, heavy rain downpours, and downbursts. There was a thick layer of clouds northwest of Montreal, near the frontal zone, but only a thin layer of low clouds further southeast. The analysis of the upper air data led to the prediction of a maximum temperature again above 30 °C (86 °F) and dew points of 23 °C (73 °F).

=== Development ===
Weather radar echoes between 1620 and 1830 UTC: 1) Hatch lines are contours of 19 dBZ, and black areas are echoes of 47 dBZ or more. 2) There is a series of four thunderstorms labeled A, B, C, and D passing over the region. 3) The Island of Montreal is at the center of the loop.

The surface low deepened as the day progressed and moved very slowly. Rising temperatures and breaking of the low clouds meant that cumulonimbus developed along the clouds' edge when the dry air at the upper level reached extreme southwestern Quebec. The Montreal-Dorval weather station showed the following conditions at 11 a.m.: temperature of 28.5 °C (83.3 °F), relative humidity of 73%, wind speed of 9 km/h, and weather conditions hazy. By noon, conditions deteriorated quickly to thunderstorms and heavy rain showers.

The weather radar loop on the right shows that a series of four thunderstorms, noted A to D, crossed the Island of Montreal from Valleyfield to Sorel. These affected roughly the same area from 1620 UTC (12:20 pm local) to 1830 UTC (2:30 pm local). The intensities on the 1.5 km height CAPPI are over 47 dBZ which represents rain rates of 40 millimetres (1.6 in) per hour or more. Three times, these intensities reached above 7 kilometres (23,000 ft), indicating the possibility of severe downbursts and hail. Some trees were uprooted and large hail reported locally but it is the amount of rain left by the thunderstorms that marked the event.

== Impact ==
Heavy rain affected all of the Island of Montreal. There was 57.8 millimetres (2.28 in) recorded at Montreal Pierre-Elliott Trudeau International Airport on the West end and 56 millimetres (2.2 in) at Rivière-des-Prairies on the East end. However the highest amounts were recorded around the Mont-Royal and downtown areas. The largest official amount has been 103 millimetres (4.1 in) at Parc Lafontaine but a non official total of 181 millimetres (7.1 in) was recorded by a City of Montreal station in the downtown core. The city of Laval that occupies Île Jésus just to the north, received a large amount of rain too, up to 72.4 millimetres (2.85 in). However, the region just across the Saint Lawrence River from Montreal was spared the worst as only 10 millimetres (0.39 in) is recorded at Saint-Hubert airport and 20 millimetres (0.79 in) in Laprairie according to Environment Canada.

Montreal's sewer system was designed to handle only 36 millimetres (1.4 in) per hour, which is a once-in-10-years occurrence, according to Gaston Moreau, assistant director of public works. The flood's return period was estimated to be at least 50 years. Lightning and wind caused widespread power outages which in turn stopped the pumping system from evacuating the excess water from low lying roads and underpasses. Décarie expressway, a sunken highway, rapidly filled with water descending from access roads and soon became a river. Thousands of motorists were trapped and had to be rescued by firefighters and truckers with higher-clearance vehicles. An 80-year-old man drowned and another person died of electrocution.

Nearly 350,000 households lost electrical power, 40,000 to 50,000 houses and businesses were flooded causing an estimated C$220 million in damages (close to half a billion C$ of 2017). Traffic was paralyzed for hours as most streets and roads had flooded areas. Montreal Metro, buses and suburban train service were stopped. The basement of an elderly care hospital in the Saint-Henri neighbourhood was flooded and 240 patients were left without electricity, food, and health services for a while.

== Long-term impact ==
Most home insurance claims were declined unless the insured was specifically covered by a clause concerning flood. However, the car owners were covered. The Quebec government promised monetary help but only 20 to 40% of the expected C$40 million was ever distributed. Court cases against the municipal authorities, including a class action, were rejected as the flood was considered in legal terms an Act of God.

In 1988, all the cities on the Island of Montreal, regrouped into the Montreal Urban Community, set up a common Emergencies Coordination Bureau (Bureau des mesures d'urgence). In 1997, the bureau was renamed Centre de sécurité civile. Following the Municipal reorganization in Quebec in 2002, most of the cities were regrouped into the greater Montreal and the center became the Centre de sécurité civile de Montréal.

== See also ==
- Saguenay flood
- 2011 Lake Champlain and Richelieu River floods
