= Semion Braude =

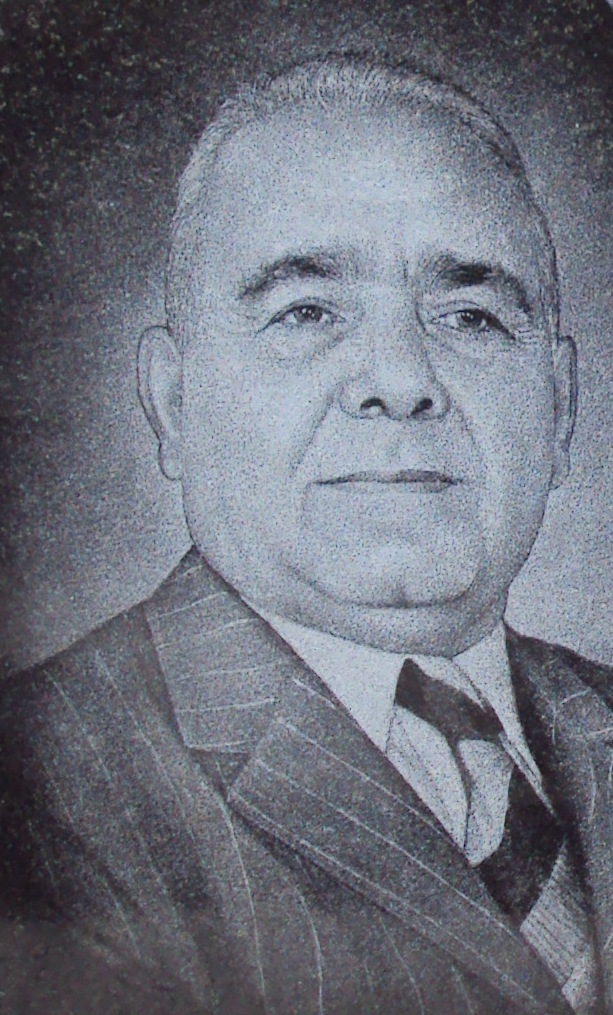
Semion Braude

Semion Yakovlevich Braude (Ukrainian: Семен Якович Брауде; 28 January 1911 – 29 June 2003) was a Soviet and Ukrainian physicist and radio astronomer.

Of Ashkenazi Jewish descent, Braude was born in Poltava, Ukraine, and pursued his higher education at the National University of Kharkiv, receiving his undergraduate degree from the Physics and Mathematics Department in 1932. He then joined the staff of the Laboratory of Electromagnetic Oscillations (LEMO) at the Ukrainian Physico-Technical Institute (UPTI), and also began graduate work at KU. His mentor was Abram A. Slutskin, professor at KU as well as head of the LEMO.

Much of the activities of the LEMO involved the development of magnetrons for generating ultra high frequency (UHF) signals. In 1936, the LEMO was tasked to study the application of magnetrons in a pulsed radio-location (radar) system for use by anti-aircraft batteries. For this project, Braude designed a superheterodyne receiver, using a low-power, tunable magnetron for use as the local oscillator. He also completed the Candidate of Sciences in 1937.

The radio-location system, code-named Zenit (a popular football team at that time), was first tested in 1938, detecting an aircraft at a distance of 3 km. After improvements were made, the revised system was tested in 1940, providing range, altitude, and azimuth for a target aircraft at up to 25 km distance. Although the time required to make the measurements was too great for anti-aircraft applications, the Zenit was the first three-coordinate radio-location system developed in the Soviet Union.

The German invasion of the Soviet Union started in June 1941, and all of the UPTI was evacuated to the Far East. The LEMO, including Slutskin, went to Bukhara in Uzbekistan. There Braude continued work on radio-location equipment, particularly the Rubin, a further improvement of the Zenit. He also continued his studies under Slutskin, being awarded the higher Doctor of Sciences degree in 1943. He was given the title of Professor in 1944. The preliminary testing of Rubin turned up a previously unreported phenomena in radio-signal propagation, later called surface or atmospheric ducting, resulting in a major decrease in signal attenuation; Braude initiated studies in this area.

Following the war, the LEMO returned to Kharkiv in mid-1945, remaining independent of the UPTI. There Braude continued research in large-scale radio propagation, eventually turning his full interest to interferometry and radio-signal analysis. In 1955, the LEMO became the Institute of Radiophysics and Electronics (IRE) of the National Academy of Sciences of Ukraine (NASU); Braude played a major role in forming the IRE. He was made a Vice-Director of the IRE, heading the Radio Astronomy Department and pioneering decametre-wavelength radio astronomy in Ukraine. In 1985, he was instrumental in forming a new academic establishment, the Institute of Radio Astronomy of NASU, branched off IRE on the basis of the former Radio Astronomy Department.

Braude's research at the IRE centered on developing large-scale radio interferometers for precisely examining extraterrestrial radio sources. He headed a program that created the Ukrainian T-shaped Radio telescope, second modification. This was the world's largest radio telescope at decametre wavelengths, with a resolution on the order of an arcsecond and a sensitivity of about 10 Jy (jansky).

Braude was a member of the editorial board of the Radiophysics and Quantum Electronics journal since it was founded in 1958. During his lifetime, he published 5 nomographs and over 300 scientific papers, and mentored some 35 doctoral students. He remained professionally active until his death in 2003.

== Awards and honors ==
- State Prize of the Soviet Union for science and engineering, 1952.
- State Prize of Ukraine for science and engineering, 1977.
- A. S. Popov Golden Medal by the USSR Academy of Sciences, 1983.
- Prize and Medal of the Euro-Asian Astronomical Society, 1997.
- On 17 April 2009 the International Astronomical Union named the Braude crater on the Moon after him.
