= Constant altitude plan position indicator =

Weather radar sweep display

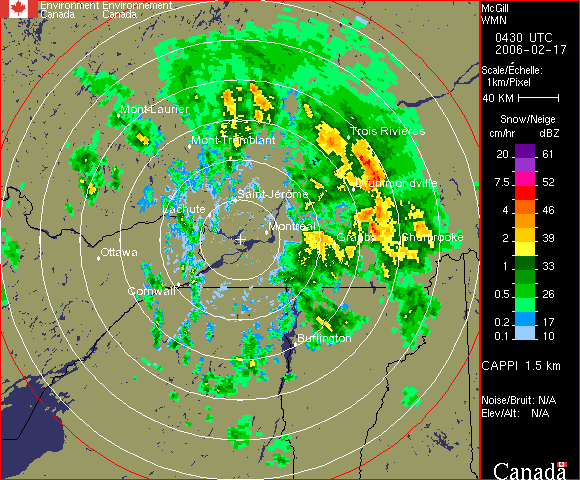
Reflectivity Cappi at 1.5 km altitude from Montréal radar (Source Environment Canada)

The constant altitude plan position indicator, better known as CAPPI, is a radar display which gives a horizontal cross-section of data at constant altitude. It has been developed by McGill University in Montreal by the Stormy Weather Group to circumvent some problems with the PPI:

- Altitude changing with distance to the radar.
- Ground echoes problems near the radar.

== Definition and history ==
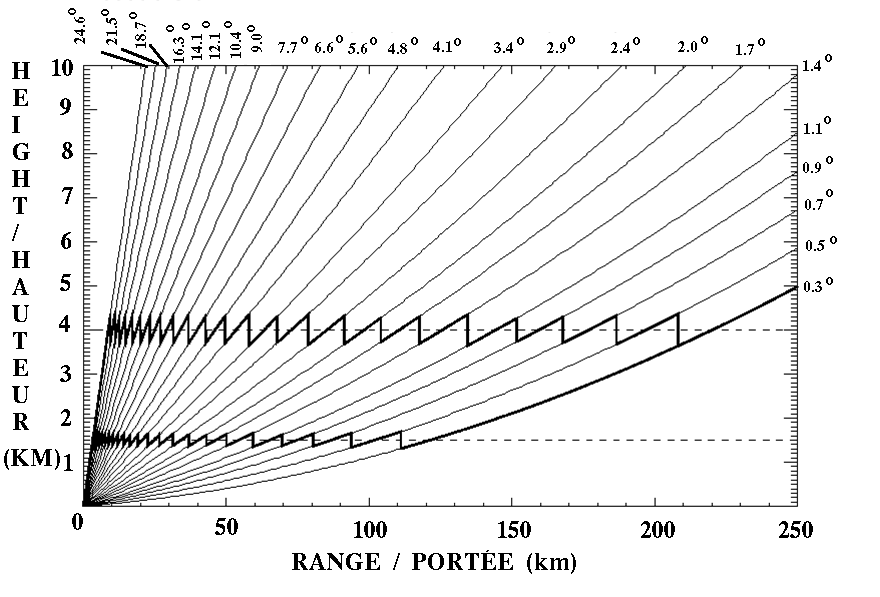
Angles available on a weather radar

In 1954, McGill University obtained a new radar (CPS-9) which had a better resolution and used FASE (Fast Azimuth Slow Elevation) to program multi-angle soundings of the atmosphere.

In 1957, Langleben and Gaherty developed a scheme with FASE to keep only the data at a certain height at each angle and scan on 360 degrees. If we look at the diagram, each angle of elevation or PPI has data at height X at a certain distance from the radar. Using the data at the right distance, one forms an annular ring of data at height X. Assembling all the rings coming from the different angles gives you the CAPPI.

The CAPPI is composed of data from each angle that is at the height requested for the cross-section (bold lines in zig-zag on the left diagram). In the early days, the scan data collected where shown directly on the cathodic screen and a photo sensitive device captured each ring as it was completed. Then all those photographed rings were assembled. By 1958, East developed a real time assembly instead of a delayed one. By the mid-1970s, computer developments made it possible to gather data in electronic form and make CAPPIs more easily.

Today, weather radars collect in real-time data on a large number of angles. Many countries such as Canada, UK and Australia, scan a large enough number of angles with their radars to have an almost continuous vertical view (taking into account the radar beam width) and produce CAPPIs. Other countries, like France and United States, use fewer angles and prefer PPIs or composite of maximum reflectivities above a point.

== Usage ==
Above right is an example of a CAPPI at 1.5 km altitude. Looking at the diagram of angles, that depending on the height of the CAPPI, there comes a distance where no data is available. The portion beyond this distance on a CAPPI is then showing data from the lowest PPI. The higher is the CAPPI above ground, the smaller is that PPI zone.

== Bibliography ==
- David Atlas, Radar in Meteorology: Battan Memorial and 40th Anniversary Radar Meteorology Conference, published by American Meteorological Society, Boston, 1990, 806 pages, ISBN 0-933876-86-6, AMS Code RADMET.
- Yves Blanchard, Le radar, 1904–2004: histoire d'un siècle d'innovations techniques et opérationnelles , published by Ellipses, Paris, France, 2004 ISBN 2-7298-1802-2
- Richard Doviak et Dusan S. Zrnic, Doppler Radar and Weather Observations, Academic Press. Second Edition, San Diego Cal., 1993 p. 562.
- Roger M. Wakimoto and Ramesh Srivastava, Radar and Atmospheric Science: A Collection of Essays in Honor of David Atlas, publié par l'American Meteorological Society, Boston, August 2003. Series: Meteorological Monograph, Volume 30, number 52, 270 pages, ISBN 1-878220-57-8; AMS Code MM52.
