= Dusan S. Zrnic =

American engineer and weather radar pioneer

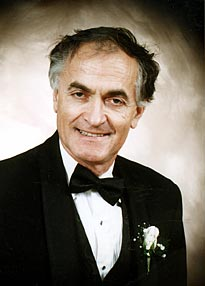
- Born: 3 June 1942
- Alma mater: University of Belgrade; University of Illinois Urbana-Champaign
- Occupation: University teacher; electrical engineer
- Employer: California State University, Northridge; National Severe Storms Laboratory; University of Oklahoma

Dušan S. Zrnić is an American engineer of Yugoslav origin, head of the Doppler Weather Radar and Remote Sensing Research Group at the National Severe Storms Laboratory (NSSL) as well as assistant professor of electrical engineering and meteorology at the University of Oklahoma in Norman, Oklahoma. His research interests include circuit design, applied mathematics, magnetohydrodynamics, radar signal processing, and systems design.

== Biography ==
Dusan Zrnic was born on June 3, 1942, in Belgrade, Yugoslavia. He received his bachelor's degree in electrical engineering in 1965 from the University of Belgrade and his master's degree the following year. Then, he studied at the University of Illinois Urbana-Champaign, USA, and received his PhD there in 1969 in the same field. Zrnic continued as a research and teaching assistant at the Charged Particle Research Laboratory at the same university, then joined the electrical engineering department at the California State University, Northridge. He became an associate professor there in 1974 and a professor in 1978.

Benefiting from a post-doctoral fellowship in 1973-73 and a sabbatical year in 1975–76, he continued research at the National Severe Storms Laboratory (NSSL). Having enjoyed the experience, he joined the NSSL a few years later. There he devoted the majority of his research to the processing of weather radar signals, including the polarimetric measurements and their interpretation, while developing algorithms for the NEXRAD radar network.

== Publications ==
Dusan S. Zrnic has published more than 150 scientific articles on weather radar signal processing, radar meteorology and remote sensing, the most important of which is the book "Doppler Radar and Weather Observations" co-authored with Dr. Richard Doviak, a reference in the field. More recently, he is the co-author of the book “Radar Polarimetry for Weather Observations”, with Alexander V. Ryzhkov, an extension of the first. He holds several US patents in the field of weather radar technology.

== Memberships and rewards ==
Since 1976, Dusan S. Zrnic has been a member of the C and F of URSI commissions, the American Meteorological Society (AMS) and the Institute of Electrical and Electronics Engineers (IEEE). In 2006, he was elected to the United States National Academy of Engineering.

D. S. Zrnic has also received numerous awards:

- 1988 co-recipient of the IEEE Harry Diamond Memorial Award for contributions and applications to weather radar science;
- 1992 co-recipient of the IEEE Donald G. Fink Prize;
- 1996 co-recipient of the Vilho Väisälä Prize of the World Meteorological Organization (WMO).
- 2004 Presidential Rank Award for outstanding career achievements;
- 2008 Remote Sensing from the AMS for substantial contributions to improving weather radars;
- 2010 Technology Transfer Award from the NOAA for his work on temporal optimization of dual polarization radar data analysis;
- 2022 NOAA Distinguished Career Award for “nearly 50 years of internationally renowned innovations in weather radar science and engineering.”

== See also ==
- History of radar
- Roger Lhermitte
