= Abram A. Slutskin =

Ukrainian scientist and professor

Abram A. Slutskin (1891–1950) was a Ukrainian scientist and professor who had a major role in shaping radio science in the Soviet Union. He was a pioneer in cavity magnetron development and the application of these devices in radio-location (radar) systems.

Slutzkin, a native of Borisoglebsk, entered the Kharkov University (KU) in 1910. He received the Candidate of Sciences (approximately equivalent to the PhD degree) from the Physics-Mathematics Department in 1916, and remained there as a docent and researcher during the turbulent times of the Russian Revolution. In 1921, prominent physicist Dmitry Rozhansky started a research department of physics at KU. Slutskin joined this activity as soon as it was formed.

Rozhansky had a strong interest in high-frequency electromagnetic oscillations, and influenced Slutskin to begin research in this area. The earlier work on magnetrons by Albert Hull (American), August Žáček (Czech), and Erich Habann (German) was studied and improved, resulting in devices generating oscillations with wavelengths between 300 and 40 cm., (It is noted that Shteinberg was the supervisor of the research unit, and, by custom, his name was added as such.) During 1928-1930, Slutskin studied in Germany under Heinrich Barkhausen at the Dresden Technische Hochschule. While there, he published another important paper on magnetrons in Annalen der Physik, a highly respected and widely read German journal.

In 1928-1929, the Ukrainian Physico-Technical Institute (UPTI) was established as a Soviet research organization in Kharkov. (The Institute was later renamed Kharkiv Institute of Physics and Technology, but the original name is used herein.) The primary staff, including Ivan V. Obreimov, the director, was transferred from the Leningrad Physico-Technical Institute (LPTI), but the UPTI shared many senior personnel with KU. Upon his return from Germany, Slutskin was awarded the Doctor of Sciences degree from KU, elevating him to the rank of professor. He was also added to the UPTI staff, heading a newly formed Laboratory of Electromagnetic Oscillations (LEMO). Here he continued with the development of magnetrons and other ultra-high-frequency (UHF) devices. At KU, his students included Aleksandr S. Usikov, Semion Y. Braude, and Ivan D. Truten, all of whom would later make major contributions in this field at the LIPT.

Under Slutskin's leadership, research at the LEMO resulted in water-cooled magnetrons generating continuous power up to 17 kW at 80 cm, and a magnetron tunable over a 30 percent wavelength variation (only reported much later). Research was also performed on frequency control and pulsed modulation. Work on magnetrons and their applications was also underway at the LIPT, and the LEMO supplied their products to researchers in Leningrad. The development of the L-Band (15–30 cm, 2–1 GHz) magnetron gained the attention of the Technical Department of the Red Army. The UPTI was tasked to investigate magnetrons for use in radio-location (radar) units. From this, an un-cooled magnetron was developed that generated pulsed power up to 60 kW at 60 to 65 cm.

In March 1937, the LEMO started an internally funded project to develop a pulsed, electromagnetic, gun-aiming system. Slutskin was responsible for the overall project under the code name Zenit, the name of a popular football team at that time. Development of the pulsed, L-band transmitter was under Usikov, and Braude designed a superheterodyne receiver using a low-power magnetron as the local oscillator. This system, with transmitting and receiving antennas separated by about 50 m, was first tested in October 1938, detecting an aircraft at 3 km in its first version.

The receiver of the initial Zenit system was not sufficiently sensitive, and was redesigned by Truten using a 955 acorn triode from RCA. In September 1940, Slutskin demonstrated the revised Zenit to the Red Army and Red Navy, detecting aircraft at ranges up to 25 km. This was the first full three-coordinate, radio-location system in the Soviet Union. However, the time required to measure the coordinates (distance, azimuth, and elevation) was too long for gun-laying in anti-aircraft batteries. Although not accepted by the military, the Zenit did show the way for further developments.

While the Zenit was being developed, there was major discord within the UPTI. The radio-location work at the LEMO was conducted in great secrecy, and other units of the UPTI objected to the lack of "freedom of scientific knowledge". It was also learned that LEMP scientists were paid substantially more than other UPTI professionals. This resulted in a push to have LEMP become a totally separate organization. At this same time, Joseph Stalin's Great Purge swept the nation, and the UPTI was a target. Many persons were arrested under charges of sabotage and two were executed by a firing squad. Slutskin and his LEMO staff, however, remained safe and turned to converting the Zenit to a new, improved system.

Germany started the invasion of the USSR in June 1941, and Kharkov was a primary target. In a short while, all of the critical operations in Kharkov were ordered to evacuate into the Far East. For this, the UPTI was split, most going to Alma-Ata in Kazakhstan, and the LEMO to Bukhar in Uzbekistan, separated by 1,500 km; thus the war accomplished what the scientists had earlier failed to do. The evacuation started in October 1941, but it was well into 1942 before facilities in Bukhara were in operation.

With Slutskin remaining the director, the new radio-location project was placed under Truten. Code-named Rubin, this system used an improved transmitter and receiver from Zenit, but had a single antenna, made possible by a device (a duplexer) personally developed by Truten. The times for determining coordinates were greatly reduced by displaying measurements on a cathode-ray tube. By August 1943, a prototype Rubin system was completed and transported to Moscow, where it was demonstrated in an anti-aircraft battery. While the Rubin was being developed, however, the USSR received a GL Mk II radar from the British. This was a well-tested, gun-laying system and was immediately reverse-engineered and placed into production, thus eliminating the need for the Rubin.

As the war closed in the summer of 1945, both the UPTI and the LEMO returned to Kharkov (changed in spelling to Kharkiv), but remained fully separate organizations. Slutskin, then in his mid-60s, continued to head the LEMO as well as serving as a professor at Kharkiv State University. Earlier, in 1939, Slutskin had been elected as a Corresponding Member of the Academy of Sciences of Ukraine, and in 1948, his status was upgraded to Academician. Before he died in 1950, Slutskin gradually turned the LEMO leadership over to Truten and Usikov. In 1955, the LEMO became the Institute of Radio-Physics and Electronics (IRE), initially headed by Usikov.

== General references ==
- Erickson, John; "Radio-location and the air defense problem: The design and development of Soviet Radar 1934-40", Social Studies of Science, vol. 2, pp. 241–268, 1972
- Tyrnov, O. F. and B. G. Yemets; "Fifty years of Kharkov University's Department of Radio Physics", Proc. of the IEEE International Crimean Conference, pp. 824–826, Sept. 2003 DOI:10.1109/CRMICO.2003.159030
- Watson, Raymond C., Jr.; Radar Origins Worldwide: History of its Evolution in 13 Nations Through World War II, Trafford Publishing, 2009
