= Richard Doviak =

American engineer and radar pioneer

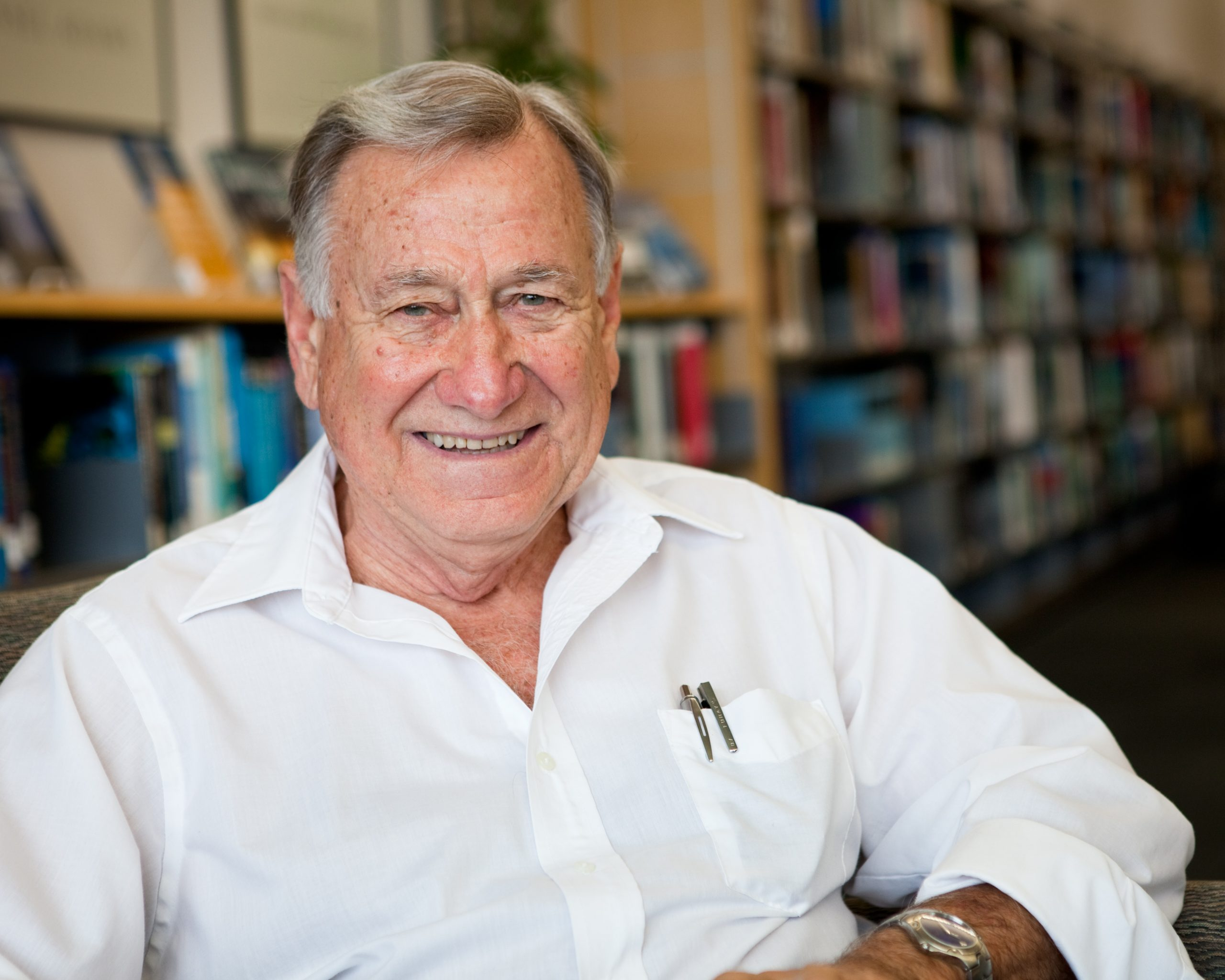
- Born: 24 December 1933
- Died: 12 March 2021 (aged 87); Norman
- Education: doctorate
- Alma mater: University of Pennsylvania; Rensselaer Polytechnic Institute
- Occupation: University teacher
- Employer: National Severe Storms Laboratory (1971–); University of Oklahoma; University of Pennsylvania (1963–1971)

Richard James Doviak was an American engineer and university professor, pioneer of weather radar. He worked for the National Oceanic and Atmospheric Administration at the National Severe Storms Laboratory developing the NEXRAD radar array using reflectivity, the Doppler effect and the dual polarization to detect precipitation and its movement in clouds. He is also the co-author with Dusan S. Zrnic of the reference book “Doppler Radar and Weather Observations” about modern weather radar and its use.

== Biography ==
Richard was born on December 24, 1933, to John and Victoria Doviak. He grew up in New Jersey, where he studied through high school. He then attended Fairleigh Dickinson University, in the same state, before continuing at the Rensselaer Polytechnic Institute from New York State and received his bachelor's degree in 1956. Thanks to a scholarship, he then completed a master's degree and then a doctorate in electrical engineering at the University of Pennsylvania (UoP), obtained in 1963.

Doviak then served as assistant professor of Electromagnetic Theory, Wave Propagation, and Scattering in Turbulent Media at UoP from 1963 to 1971. He was also a principal investigator at the Valley Forge Research Center from 1967, conducting experiments measuring the forward scattering and backscattering of electromagnetic waves in the cloudless troposphere.

He moved to Oklahoma in 1972 to direct the weather radar program at the National Severe Storms Laboratory (NSSL) in Norman, Oklahoma. There he directed the Doppler weather radar project from 1971 to 1987 which led to the development of the NEXRAD network, covering the entire United States since 1990, and which is an essential tool for detection of dangerous meteorological phenomena. His team also possibly developed the first-ever real-time Doppler velocity radar display for a weather radar in 1972, according to Doviak.

Doviak later participated in the development of the Polarimetric Weather Radar. This technology, added during the 2010s to NEXRAD, provides National Weather Service forecasters with a measurement of the size and shape of targets like hail. While at the NSSL, he became an assistant professor with the School of Electrical and Computer Engineering and the School of Meteorology at the University of Oklahoma.

He never retired but continued to write articles, to speak at conferences around the world, and advise generations of meteorologists at the University of Oklahoma. For example, shortly before his death, Doviak completed a project with scientists in Hong Kong studying the detection of lightning. He died of cancer on March 12, 2021, at the age of 87. His funeral took place at Saint-Thomas More Roman Catholic Parish in Norman, Oklahoma.

== Publications ==
He has published, as author or co-author, numerous scientific articles in more than 20 journals covering his interests in the fields of geosciences, engineering, physics, and meteorology. His best-known book is Doppler Radar and Weather Observations, co-written with Dusan S. Zrnic, which has become a reference in the field. He was guest editor for a special issue of the IEEE Transactions on Geoscience and Remote Sensing (TGRS) in 1979, on the topic of radar meteorology; associate editor of the Journal of Atmospheric and Oceanic Technology of the AMS from 1984 to 1988, and of Applied Meteorology from 1977 to 1980; finally editor-in-chief of the TGRS from 1988 to 1991.

== Recognition and affiliations ==
Doviak was a member of the American Meteorological Society (AMS) and the Cooperative Institute for Mesoscale Meteorological Studies (CIMMS) at the University of Oklahoma. He was elected a Fellow of the Institute of Electrical and Electronics Engineers (IEEE) in 1988 and of the AMS in 1999.

He has received the following awards:

- 1980 and 1982 NOAA Outstanding Scientific Publications Award;
- 1981 NASA Prize for his group's achievement on Doppler lidar;
- 1988 IEEE Harry Diamond Memorial Award for Outstanding Contribution to Public Service;
- 1993 Geoscience and Remote Sensing Society Outstanding Service Award;
- 2014 NOAA Distinguished Career Award for the development of weather radar and the interpretation of its data;
- 2016 AMS Remote Sensing Award “for fundamental contributions to the science and technology of weather radar, with applications to the observation of severe storms and tropospheric winds.”

He also won a gold medal at the Oklahoma Senior Olympics in cycling.
