= List of American Catholic priests =

This is a list of notable Catholic priests from or most linked to the United States. This list is incomplete. Notable bishops may be found at List of Catholic bishops in the United States.

== Latin Catholic ==
=== Order of Saint Augustine ===
- Rev. Peter M. Donohue, President of Villanova University.

=== Congregation of St. Basil (Basilians) ===
- Thomas Rosica, C.S.B. – Chief executive officer of Salt + Light Catholic Media Foundation (2003‍–‍2019)

=== Premonstratensians ===
- Fr. Robert John Cornell, Represented Wisconsin's 8th congressional district for four years, abandoned a bid to retake the seat after the Vatican ordered all priests to withdraw from politics.

=== Order of Saint Benedict (Benedictines) ===
- Fr. David Granfield, Canon law jurists and Pro-Life person.
- Fr. Celestine Kapsner, Exorcist and translator.
- Msgr. Barry O'Toole, A founder of the Catholic Radical Alliance.
- Rev. Michael Patella, Professor of Theology at the College of Saint Benedict and Saint John's University.
- Fr. Magnus Wenninger, Mathematician known constructing polyhedron models.

==== Order of Cistercians of the Strict Observance (Trappists) ====
- Fr. Thomas Keating, Associated to Contemplative Outreach and Centering prayer.
- Fr. Thomas Merton, Poet, social activist, and student of comparative religion.

=== Dominican Order ===
- Fr. Benedict Ashley, Theologian and philosopher.
- Rev. Gilbert V. Hartke, A showman, sometimes called the "show-biz priest", and a statesman.
- Rev. Brian Shanley, Former president of Providence College, current president of St. John's University in New York.

=== Franciscans ===
- Fr. Albert Braun, worked with the Mescalero.
- Fr. Angelico Chavez, A prominent New Mexican historian and writer.
- Fr. Anton Docher
- Fr. Mariano Gagnon, author who worked with indigenous Peruvians during the Internal conflict in Peru
- Fr. Kevin Mackin, President of Mount Saint Mary College.
- Fr. Michael Scanlan, Former President of Franciscan University of Steubenville and Pro-Life activities.

==== Order of Friars Minor Capuchin (Capuchins) ====
- Rev. Regis J. Armstrong, Professor in the School of Religious Studies at The Catholic University of America who is an expert on Francis of Assisi and Clare of Assisi.
- Father Thomas Weinandy, Executive Director of Secretariat for Doctrine and Pastoral Practices of the United States Conference of Catholic Bishops (USCCB).

==== Franciscan Friars of the Renewal ====
- Fr. Stan Fortuna, Musician noted for Catholic-based hip hop.
- Fr. Benedict Groeschel, Former Eternal Word Television Network host and psychologist.

=== Congregation of Holy Cross ===
- Fr. James Wm. Chichetto, Poet, artist, and professor.
- Fr. William Corby, Former President of the University of Notre Dame.
- Fr. Theodore Hesburgh, Former President of the University of Notre Dame.
- Rev. Edward Malloy Former President of the University of Notre Dame.
- Rev. Julius Nieuwland, Chemist, known for research that led to the invention of neoprene, and botanist who founded the American Midland Naturalist.
- Fr. John Augustine Zahm, Scientist and writer who defended certain aspects of evolutionary theory as true.

=== Holy Ghost Fathers ===
- Fr. Jeremiah J. Callahan, Fifth President of Duquesne University.
- Fr. Vernon F. Gallagher, Eighth President of Duquesne University.
- Fr. Martin Hehir, Fourth President of Duquesne University.
- Fr. Raymond V. Kirk, Sixth President of Duquesne University.
- Fr. Henry J. McAnulty, Ninth President of Duquesne University.
- Fr. Eugene McGuigan, First athletic director of Duquesne University.
- Fr. William Patrick Power, First head of Duquesne University and the subject of an Eternal Word Television Network special.
- Fr. Francis P. Smith, Seventh President of Duquesne University.
- Fr. Joseph Strub, Founder of Duquesne University.
- Fr. John Willms, Second Rector of Pittsburgh Catholic College which would become Duquesne University.

=== Society of Jesus (Jesuits) ===
- Fr. Daniel Berrigan, Activist who was part of the Catonsville Nine and the Plowshares Movement.
- Fr. Virgil Blum, Founded the Catholic League.
- Fr. George Coyne, Former director of the Vatican Observatory.
- Fr. Brian E. Daley, Ratzinger Prize winning theologian.
- Fr. Joe Devlin, Worked with the poor of Southeast Asia during the Vietnam War.
- James H. Dolan, S.J., The second President of Fairfield University.
- James E. FitzGerald, S.J., The fourth President of Fairfield University.
- Louis J. Gallagher, S.J., Former President of Boston College and translator.
- Frank Haig, S.J., Former President of Wheeling Jesuit University and younger brother of Alexander Haig.
- Father Morton A. Hill, S.J. Anti-Pornography activist who, in 1970, was a member of the President's Commission on Obscenity and Pornography.
- John F. Laboon, S.J., Chaplain during the Vietnam War.
- Fr. James B. Macelwane, President of the American Geophysical Union from 1953 until his death in 1956.
- William C. McInnes, S.J., The fifth President of Fairfield University.
- Rev. Paul McNally, Astronomer.
- C. J. McNaspy, S.J., Musicologist, Author and Linguist
- Fr. James A. Martin, Founding director of the Loyola Retreat House in Charles County, Maryland who lived to be a 105.
- Fr. James J. Martin, Author and an editor of America.
- Fr. J. Donald Monan – Former president of Boston College (1972–1996).
- Fr. John Navone, Scholar associated to Gonzaga University.
- Fr. Joseph T. O'Callahan, Chaplain during World War II.
- Fr. Walter J. Ong, Important scholar in the fields of media studies and language.
- Fr. Mitch Pacwa – EWTN host who is bi-ritual in that he can also celebrate liturgy in the Maronite rite.
- Fr. Stephen Privett, President of the University of San Francisco.
- Rev. Paul Clare Reinert, S.J., a former President of Saint Louis University.
- Fr. Thomas Ewing Sherman, Lecturer and son of William Tecumseh Sherman.
- Fr. Edmund A. Walsh, Geopolitician and academic.

=== Josephite Fathers ===
- Fr. Charles Uncles, One of the first African-American seminarians to be educated and ordained a priest in the United States.

=== Legionaries of Christ ===
- Fr. Jonathan Morris, Author and Fox News Channel contributor.

=== Maryknoll Order ===
- Fr. James Keller, Founder of The Christophers.

=== Congregation of the Mission ===
- Fr. Donald J. Harrington, Fifteenth President of St. John's University who retired over a financial controversy.
- Fr. Oscar Lukefahr, theologian, writer, and Christian apologist
- Rev. Stafford Poole, Research historian and Mesoamericanist.
- Rev. Dennis H. Holtschneider president of Association of Catholic Colleges and Universities former president of DePaul University and former administrator at St. John's University.
- Rev. James J. Maher president of Niagara University and former administrator at St. John's University.

=== Congregatio Passionis Iesu Christi (Passionists) ===
- Fr. Edward L. Beck, Author, retreat conductor, and a religion contributor for ABC News.
- Fr. Thomas Berry, "Earth scholar"/Eco-theologian influenced by Pierre Teilhard de Chardin.

=== Paulist Fathers ===
- Fr. Francis Asbury Baker, Episcopalian convert who was one of the founders of the Paulist Institute.
- Fr. Lawrence Boadt, Bible scholar involved in Jewish/Christian dialogue.
- Fr. George Deshon, Graduate of West Point who was an early Paulist and helped design the St. Paul the Apostle Church in Manhattan.
- Fr. Augustine Francis Hewit, Convert who was a founder of the Paulists and became their second Superior General.
- Fr. Norman O'Connor, Sometimes called "The Jazz Priest" he wrote album notes for a Gerry Mulligan's quartet album.
- Fr. George Mary Searle, Astronomer who started out as a human computer.
- Rev. Clarence A. Walworth, Attorney, writer, and founding member of the order who translated Holy God, We Praise Thy Name from the German Großer Gott, wir loben dich.

=== Congregation of the Sacred Hearts of Jesus and Mary (Picpus Fathers) ===
- Rev. Lane K. Akiona, Native Hawaiian who also belongs to the Order of the Holy Sepulchre.

=== Priestly Fraternity of St. Peter ===
- Fr. John Berg
- Rev. George Gabet

=== Priestly Society of the Holy Cross ===
- Fr. C. John McCloskey, He worked on Wall Street, Citibank and Merrill Lynch, before becoming a priest who has hosted EWTN specials.

=== Congregation of the Most Holy Redeemer (Redemptorists) ===
- Rev. John A. Collins, United States Air Force chaplain.
- Fr. Joe Maier, Co-founded the Human Development Foundation and works among the poor in the Khlong Toei District.
- Fr. Francis X. Murphy, Army chaplain in the Korean War who wrote, under the pseudonym Xavier Rynne, controversial articles about attending the Second Vatican Council.

=== Order of Servants of Mary (Servites) ===
- Rev. John T. Pawlikowski, Professor Emeritus of Social Ethics at Catholic Theological Union and active in the United States Holocaust Memorial Museum. He is also a critic of the book Hitler's Pope, by John Cornwell.

=== Society of Saint-Sulpice (Sulpicians) ===
- Rev. Raymond E. Brown, Biblical scholar who specialized in commentary on the New Testament.
- Fr. John Francis Cronin, Author of Communism: A World Menace, but also critical of right-wing fringe groups and a supporter of the civil rights movement.
- Fr. Alphonse Magnien, French-born superior of St. Mary's Seminary and University.

=== Other or not specified orders ===
- Msgr. Peter Armstrong, Chaplain for the San Francisco 49ers in the 1980s and 1990s.
- Msgr. Geno Baroni, Activist who was linked to the National Center for Urban Ethnic Affairs and was the first President of the National Italian American Foundation.
- Msgr Ralph W. Beiting, Known for the Christian Appalachian Project.
- Msgr. John P. Boland, Buffalo, New York priest known for work with the labor movement.
- Fr. Martin Stanislaus Brennan Scientist who wrote about the relationship between religion and science.
- Msgr. Ambrose Burke, A former President of St. Ambrose University.
- Msgr. James F. Checchio, Rector of the Pontifical North American College.
- Fr. George Clements, Known for the "one church one child program" and adopting a child. Louis Gossett Jr. played him in The Father Clements Story.
- Fr. Daniel Coughlin, First Catholic priest to be Chaplain of the United States House of Representatives.
- Fr. James Renshaw Cox, Known for Cox's Army and running for president under the banner of the Jobless Party.
- Fr. James Coyle, A priest killed by a member of the Ku Klux Klan.
- Fr. Jeremiah Williams Cummings, Writer and friend of Orestes Brownson.
- Fr. James Curley, First director of the Georgetown University Astronomical Observatory.
- Fr. Francis P. Duffy, Historic military chaplain for the Fighting 69th.
- Msgr. John Joseph Egan, Activist who was among the marchers in the Selma to Montgomery marches.
- Fr. George Elder, Educator and an editor of "Catholic Advocate" of Louisville, Kentucky.
- Msgr. John Tracy Ellis, Academic who criticized the standards of 1950s Catholic education and was a past president of the American Catholic Historical Association.
- Msgr. Joseph Clifford Fenton, Theologian.
- Fr. Gerald Fitzgerald, Founded the Congregation of the Servants of the Paraclete.
- Msgr. Edward J. Flanagan.
- Fr. José Manuel Gallegos, Democratic Party politician and part of the History of New Mexico.
- Fr. James Gower, Peace activist and co-founder of the College of the Atlantic.
- Msgr. Peter Guilday, A noted historian of the Catholic Church's history.
- Msgr. George G. Higgins, advocate for labor rights.
- Rev. Robert P. Imbelli, Theologian at Boston College.
- Fr. Lawrence Jenco, Gained news attention for being taken hostage in Beirut.
- Fr. Rob Keighron, Co-host of The Catholic Guy.
- Msgr. Charles Kekumano, Native Hawaiian who co-wrote "Broken Trust", which criticized the Kamehameha Schools.
- Msgr. George Kerr, Inducted into the College Football Hall of Fame in 1984 and a chaplain to the Massachusetts House of Representatives.
- Fr. James J. LeBar, An exorcist.
- Msgr. Kevin McCoy A former rector of the Pontifical North American College.
- Fr. Robert McQueeney, Actor and golfer who became a priest and spiritual director for the Padre Pio Foundation of America.
- Msgr. Cletus Madsen, A music director and St. Ambrose University person.
- Msgr. Francis A. Marzen, Former editor of the Hawaii Catholic Herald who worked as a city information specialist for mayor Frank Fasi.
- Fr. William Menster, First clergyman to visit Antarctica.
- Msgr. Marvin Mottet, Recipient of the Pacem in Terris Award.
- Fr. Richard John Neuhaus, Convert from Lutheranism who wrote The Naked Public Square: Religion and Democracy in America and founded First Things.
- Msgr. James Hugh O'Neill, Army Chaplain who served with George S. Patton.
- Fr. Frank Pavone, National Director of Priests for Life.
- Fr. Ralph S. Pfau, First priest to join Alcoholics Anonymous.
- Fr. Michael Pfleger, Activist and subject of the book Radical Disciple – Father. Pfleger, St. Sabina Church, and the Fight for Social Justice.
- Fr. T. Lawrason Riggs, First Catholic chaplain of Yale University who, in his twenties, co-wrote the unsuccessful comic opera See America First with Cole Porter.
- Msgr. John A. Ryan, Noted writer and advocate concerned with Catholic social teaching.
- Fr. Aloysius Schmitt, United States Navy chaplain killed during the Attack on Pearl Harbor.
- Fr. Mike Schmitz, priest and podcaster.
- Rev. Dr. Robert Skeris, A founding member of the Church Music Association of America and a Knight Commander of the Equestrian Order of the Holy Sepulchre.
- Fr. Robert Smith, Chaplain with the Cornell Catholic Community.
- Msgr. William Smith, Taught at Saint Joseph's Seminary in Dunwoodie and associated to EWTN.
- Msgr. Peter Vaghi, Member of the Board of Trustees of The Catholic University of America and chaplain of the John Carroll Society.
- Fr. Tim Vakoc, Army chaplain who died of injuries caused by a bomb in Iraq.
- Fr. Kenneth Vavrina, Social justice advocate.
- Fr. John P. Washington, One of the Four Chaplains.
- Fr. Charles J. Watters, Medal of Honor winning Army chaplain.

== Eastern Catholic priests ==
=== Melkite Greek Catholic priests ===
- Fr. Sergio Ayala, administrator of St. Michael the Archangel, Hammond, IN.
- Fr. George Bisharat, retired priest who formed Annunciation Mission, Covina, CA, Epharchy of Newton.
- Fr. Eddie Doherty, He had previously been known as a reporter.
- Rev. Emmanuel Charles McCarthy, Noted advocate for peace and non-violence.

=== Ruthenian Catholic priests ===
- Msgr. Basil Shereghy, Eastern-rite scholar.

=== Ukrainian Greek Catholic Church ===
- Fr. Jules C. E. Riotte,

== Laicized priests ==
- Dismas Becker, Civil rights activists and Democratic Party politician.
- Jonathan Morris, former Fox News commentator .

== See also ==
- List of Catholic priests
- List of Catholic bishops in the United States
- Historical list of the Catholic bishops of the United States
