= McAnulty =

McAnulty is a surname. It is a variant of McNulty.

Notable people with the name include:

- Dara McAnulty (born 2004), Northern Irish naturalist and writer
- George McAnulty (played in 1952), New Zealand Association football player
- Henry J. McAnulty (1915–1995), Roman Catholic priest and American academic
- James P. McAnulty (in office 2013-2015), American diplomat
- John McAnulty (died 1989), Northern Irish Catholic who was murdered
- Kieran McAnulty (born 1985), New Zealand politician
- Nicholas McAnulty, actor in Australian/British 2009 film The Boys Are Back
- Paul McAnulty (born 1981), American baseball outfielder
- Sarah McAnulty (active 2011-), American squid biologist and science communicator
- William E. McAnulty Jr. (1947–2007), justice of the Kentucky Supreme Court

== See also ==
- McNulty
- McAnulty College and Graduate School of Liberal Arts, part of Duquesne University, Pennsylvania, United States
