= Vernon F. Gallagher =

American Roman Catholic priest and university president

Eighth President of Duquesne University of the Holy Ghost
- In office 1950–1959
- Preceded by: Rev. Francis P. Smith
- Succeeded by: Rev. Henry J. McAnulty

Personal details
- Born: September 26, 1914 Sharpsburg, Pennsylvania
- Died: August 14, 2014 (aged 99) Allison Park, Pennsylvania
- Education: University of Pennsylvania (M.A., Ph.D.)

Ecclesiastical career
- Religion: Christianity
- Church: Roman Catholic Church
- Ordained: 1939 (priest)
- Congregations served: Sacred Heart Parish, Emsworth

Vernon F. Gallagher (September 26, 1914 – August 14, 2014) was an American Roman Catholic priest who served as the eighth president of Duquesne University in Pittsburgh, Pennsylvania, from 1950 until 1959. After leaving the priesthood in 1972, he was an academic administrator at St. Michael's College in Colchester, Vermont.

== Early life and education ==
Vernon F. Gallagher was born in the Pittsburgh suburb of Sharpsburg, Pennsylvania, on September 26, 1914. He was an altar boy at his home parish of St. Mary's, where he was first introduced to the Holy Ghost Fathers who administered the parish. He later entered the Spiritan novitiate himself, and was ordained a priest in 1939. As a seminarian, Gallagher was noted for his musical talent; he played piano and organ, and even composed an operetta.

Following his ordination, Gallagher earned a master's degree in English at the University of Pennsylvania and served as a professor at Duquesne University. He rose in the university faculty, being appointed dean of the College of Arts and Sciences, then vice president, and finally university president in 1950.

Gallagher studied Latin and Ancient Greek in the course of his education, and learned Spanish, German, French, and Slovak on his own.

== Service to Duquesne University ==
Duquesne University history professor Joseph Rishel describes Gallagher, who officially began his duties as Duquesne's president on July 1, 1950, as "[y]oung, handsome, insightful, and intelligent", and therefore posed to achieve great things at Duquesne. Gallagher was young, assuming his office at only 36 years of age, and was still finishing his education while serving as a university president. He earned a Ph.D. in English from the University of Pennsylvania in 1952; his dissertation was on the poetry of John Lydgate.

Gallagher had a high profile as president, and was featured in a June 18, 1953, special edition of the Pittsburgh Press as one of 100 "outstanding leaders of the future—young men most likely to write exciting new chapters in our city's progress". He also served on the steering committee for Pittsburgh's new public television station, WQED. He eventually became so widely known that he was invited to deliver the opening prayer for the 84th Congress in 1955, and met with President Eisenhower in Washington. Gallagher used his numerous speaking engagements as a way to increase the public reputation of Duquesne, and later stated that he "never turned down an offer of a speaking engagement."

Although student enrollment during Gallagher's tenure suffered from the Korean War draft, after the war's conclusion in 1953 the population of the student body rose by a predictable six percent every year for the rest of his tenure. This reliable growth allowed for prudential planning for the expanding university. Gallagher's first priority was a renewal of Duquesne's campus, and he rallied support for what would become the "Master Plan" for redeveloping and consolidating the university's property on the Bluff.

Although Gallagher initially thought that Duquesne should move from its downtown location to the suburbs—Bethel Park in particular was considered—that opinion put him in the minority in the university's administration. It was decided that Duquesne should stay on the Bluff, as the area had easy access to public transportation and the university had already made significant investments in the area.

Under Gallagher's administration, the university constructed Trinity Hall, the community residence of the Holy Ghost Fathers on campus, as well as Rockwell Hall, nowadays home to Duquesne's School of Business, and Assumption Hall, the first student dormitory constructed for resident students at Duquesne. Gallagher also made inroads in purchasing land in the area surrounding Duquesne's campus, allowing for future expansion. In fact, Assumption Hall's location, near Mercy Hospital, several blocks away from Old Main, was intended to demarcate the extent of expansion intended for the university's campus. One minor, but lasting contribution that Gallagher made to the campus was personally designing and constructing the Our Lady of Lourdes grotto behind the "Old Main" Administration building in 1954. Gallagher's finished Master Plan covered an area of 28.5 acres (11.5 ha) at a projected cost of $13 million. Fundraising toward that goal continued throughout Gallagher's administration, and Gallagher himself was aware of the long-term nature of the project, announcing, "It is not a job for today or tomorrow, but for the years to come."

Duquesne also made accomplishments in racial integration under Gallagher, who was a staunch supporter of the cause. Duquesne crowned an African-American woman "Duquesne Darling" in 1953, and it was noted that her mother had also attended the university. In addition, the university celebrated Carver Day and founded a scholarship for African-American students.

== After Duquesne ==
Gallagher was elected provincial superior of the American Province of the Holy Ghost Fathers in July 1958. Although he continued in his responsibilities as a university president while accepting the new assignment, the office of the province was moved to Washington, D.C. in November 1958. The strain of commuting between Pittsburgh and Washington, in addition to the respective responsibilities of the positions, convinced Gallagher to resign as president. He announced his resignation on June 19, 1959, and it became effective on October 1 of the same year. He was succeeded as university president by another Holy Ghost Father, Henry J. McAnulty.

Gallagher continued with his life as a Spiritan priest after Duquesne. In 1971, he became pastor of Sacred Heart Parish in Emsworth, Pennsylvania, and was named director of the Holy Childhood Association in the United States a year later in 1972.

== Later life ==
In 1972, Gallagher left the Catholic priesthood. His family cited the reason as being that Gallagher "thought he had given all he could as a priest and was looking for another outlet through which to serve." He subsequently married his wife, Catherine, and lived to see four grandchildren and eight great-grandchildren.

Gallagher continued to be involved in higher education, serving as a professor, academic dean and vice president at St. Michael's College in Vermont. He served on the steering committee for WQED, a public TV station in the Pittsburgh area. After retirement, he moved to Florida for a time. He died in Allison Park on August 14, 2014, at the age of 99.

In 2005, Duquesne established the Vernon F. Gallagher Chair for the Integration of Science, Philosophy, and Law. At the time of his death, Duquesne president Charles Dougherty commented positively on Gallagher's tenure as president, noting, "He added lay representatives to our Board for the first time. And he refused a Sugar Bowl bid for our football team because Louisiana enforced segregation at the game. Gallagher was a man ahead of his time."

== Notes and references ==
Works cited

- Belculfine, Lexi (August 16, 2014), "Obituary: Vernon F. Gallagher / Duquesne president expanded campus in the 1950s", Pittsburgh Post-Gazette
- "Dr. Vernon F. Gallagher", Pittsburgh Post-Gazette, August 17, 2014
- Education for the Mind, Heart, and Spirit: Duquesne University Self-Study (PDF), Duquesne University Self-Steering Committee, January 2008, archived from the original (PDF) on 2011-09-29
- One Heart, One Spirit, vol. XXXVIII, no. 2, Congregation of the Holy Spirit, March–April 2010
- Rishel, Joseph F.; Demilio, Paul (1997), "The Spirit That Gives Life": The History of Duquesne University, 1878-1996, Pittsburgh, Pennsylvania: Duquesne University Press, ISBN 0-8207-0268-4
- Snyder, James L. (December 1952). "Duquesne University, 1878–1953". Catholic Educational Review. Vol. 50. pp. 649–665.

Catholic Church titles
Preceded by Rev. Francis P. Smith	President of Duquesne University; 1950–1959	Succeeded by Rev. Henry J. McAnulty
