= Martin Hehir =

Roman Catholic priest and university president (1855–1935)

Rev. Martin A. Hehir, C.S.Sp.
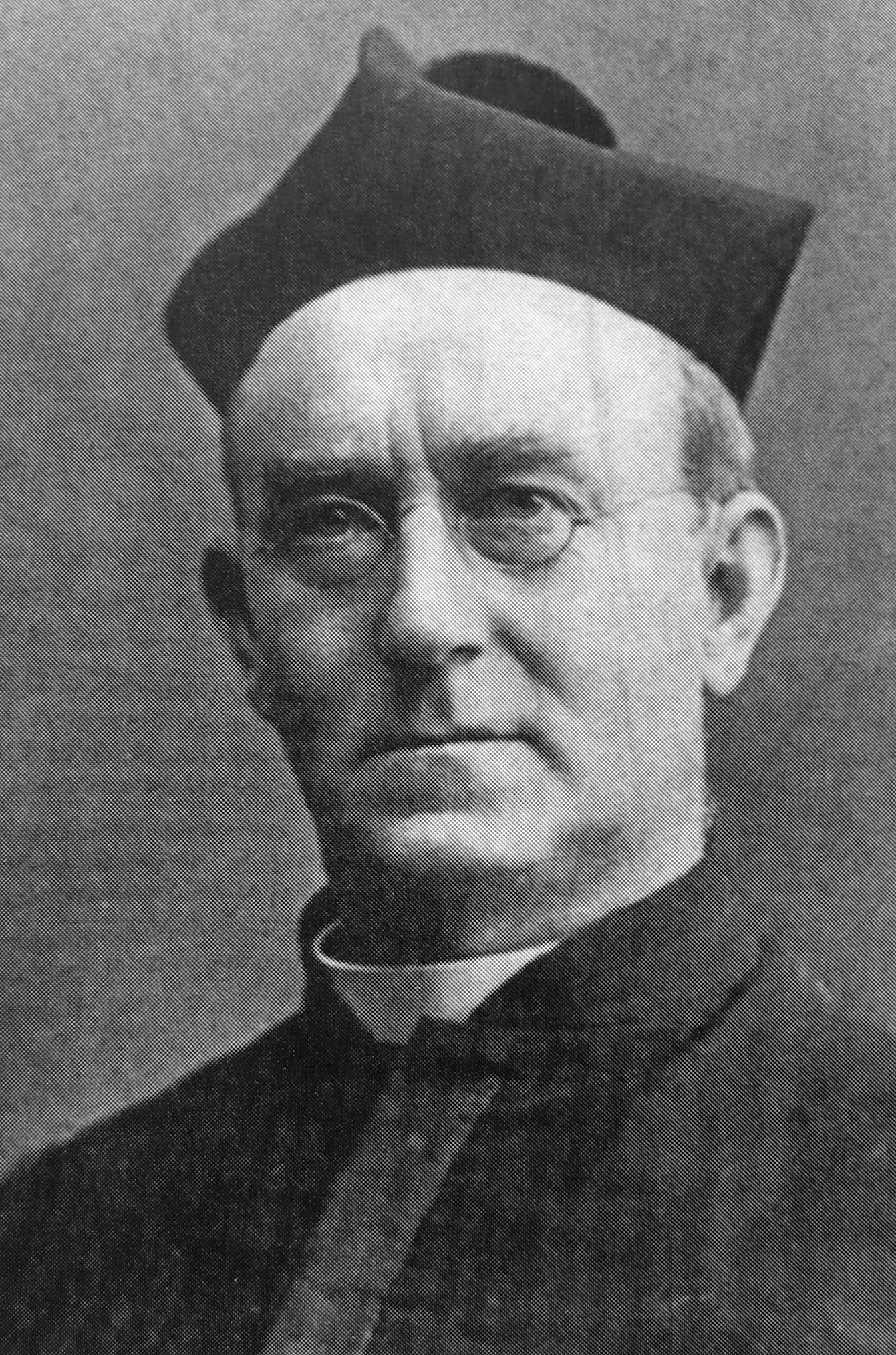
- Hehir, c. 1910

Fourth President of Duquesne University of the Holy Ghost
- In office 1899–1930
- Preceded by: Rev. John T. Murphy
- Succeeded by: Rev. Jeremiah J. Callahan

Personal details
- Born: November 10, 1855; Kildysart, County Clare, Ireland
- Died: June 9, 1935 (aged 79); Pittsburgh, Pennsylvania

Martin A. Hehir C.S.Sp. (/ˈhɛər/; November 10, 1855 – June 9, 1935) was a Roman Catholic priest and the fourth president of Pittsburgh Catholic College (later called Duquesne University). Hehir served as president of the university from 1899 until 1930. In Hehir's thirty-one years of presidency, the small college grew to become a university and the seventh largest Catholic school in the United States. After his retirement, Hehir served as Superior of the Holy Ghost Missionary College near Philadelphia, and then as the Superior of the Spiritan Fathers at Ferndale Seminary in Norwalk, Connecticut, until his death.

== Personal background ==
Martin Hehir was born near Kildysart, County Clare, Ireland, in 1855. He graduated from Blackrock College in 1887, having obtained a traditional classical education. After teaching there for three years, Hehir went on to receive theological training at the Theological College in Chevilly outside of Paris and was ordained as a priest in the Congregation of the Holy Ghost in 1883. He came to Pittsburgh in 1884 as a professor of languages at the Pittsburgh Catholic College. By 1892, he was vice-president of the college.

== President of Duquesne University ==
Fifteen years after he had arrived in Pittsburgh, Father Hehir became president of the Pittsburgh Catholic College, succeeding Father John Murphy on August 20, 1899. His first move was to reorganize the college, creating a clearly defined College Division (akin to the four-year college track common in the United States today), as distinct from the Preparatory School, as well as taking steps to reconcile ethnic tensions between the Irish administration of the college and the German Catholic community in Pittsburgh. He also reconciled the college debt by 1900.

Several Catholic institutions at the time were making moves toward university status, so in 1910, Hehir's administration decided to submit an application to a special College and University Council from the Commonwealth of Pennsylvania. (Note: St. John's University, Marquette, DePaul, and Loyola of Chicago all made moves toward university status between the years of 1906 and 1909.) Nine months of hearings and evaluations ensued; on March 30, 1911, the petition for a change of charter was granted, and the college was reincorporated as a university. (Note: Less than two months later, the name of the university—originally "The University of the Holy Ghost"—was revised to "Duquesne University of the Holy Ghost" to avoid profaning the name "Holy Ghost" in newspaper headlines such as U. of Pittsburgh Whips Holy Ghost.) At the time, it was the only Catholic university between Washington, D.C., and South Bend, Indiana.

Father Hehir's vision of expansion for the new university was the impetus for the foundation of a law school in September 1911, and in 1913, the Business School was founded as the School of Accounts, Finance, and Commerce. A personal dream of Hehir's—the foundation of a School of Speech Arts and Drama—was also accomplished in 1913. (Note: Due to low enrollment, the drama school would be phased out by 1940.) Various other departments and schools were founded at Duquesne before World War I, including a School of Social Services, the School of Graduate Studies, and Departments of Sanitary Science and Public Health, Vocal and Instrumental Music, Fine Arts, Pre-Medical, Spanish Language, and Latin American Commerce.

After World War I, Duquesne University was in a position to expand its physical facilities. Father Hehir undertook a vigorous fundraising campaign, and a gymnasium and academic building were constructed. With the additional space provided by these new constructions, the university founded a School of Pharmacy, which was officially opened in September 1925. In 1926, the School of Music was also founded, offering "melody writing, Gregorian Chant, and other forms of musical composition". Completing this spree of expansion was the foundation of the School of Education in 1927.

Throughout these years of expansion, Father Hehir maintained a tradition of student assemblies, which imparted a sense of intimacy and elevated Hehir to the status of a father figure. In fact, most students knew him solely by a term of endearment, "Daddy Hehir". These assemblies frequently addressed student behavior.

Father Hehir's thirty-one year presidency has been the longest by far of any Duquesne president. His administration saw a sixfold increase in enrollment from 1911 to 1921, and witnessed Duquesne emerge to become the seventh-largest Catholic school in the country; this meteoric rise can be attributed largely to Hehir's pragmatism and commitment to serving the Catholic community in Pittsburgh during a time when immigrants struggled to assimilate into larger society. Moreover, at the beginning of his presidency, Hehir took stock of the needs of the immigrant community in Pittsburgh and transformed the Pittsburgh Catholic College from a basically liberal arts school into an institution with a focus on more practical disciplines in legal and commercial fields.

== Retirement and death ==
An official announcement that Hehir would resign from the office of president was made in Pittsburgh newspapers on October 13, 1930. The Superior General of the Congregation of the Holy Ghost subsequently reassigned Hehir as Superior of the Holy Ghost Missionary College in Cornwell Heights, near Philadelphia. Later, he served as Superior of the Senior Seminary of the Holy Ghost Order at Ferndale, in Norwalk, Connecticut.

While in Norwalk, Father Hehir received news that he was terminally ill with cancer. He announced that he wished to die in the city of Pittsburgh, and on June 9, 1935, he died at Mercy Hospital, only three blocks away from Duquesne University. Future Spiritan priest and president of Duquesne University Henry J. McAnulty, an undergraduate student at the time, served at Hehir's funeral Mass on June 11, 1935.

Hehir's body was then taken from the university chapel to St. Paul's Cathedral, where a vigil was held by alumni throughout the night. A funeral, celebrated by the provincial of the Holy Ghost Fathers, Fr. Henry J. Goebel, followed at the cathedral on June 12. A second Mass was held at 10 a.m. by Hehir's successor as president, J. J. Callahan; an Office of the Dead, attended by Pittsburgh Bishop Hugh C. Boyle, and Bishop Daniel F. Desmond of Alexandria, Louisiana, preceded the Mass. Afterwards, the body was moved to Holy Ghost College at Cornwell Heights for a final Mass and subsequent interment.

== Legacy ==
By the end of Father Hehir's presidency he was being lauded for the positive legacy he left at Duquesne and in the city of Pittsburgh. A Mr. Reis declared at his retirement dinner that "There is no other living man in the city of Pittsburgh who by his work and his labor has rendered so much good and has radiated such a wonderful influence over this community as [Father Martin Hehir]."

Joseph Rishel, in his history of Duquesne University, The Spirit that Gives Life, writes of Father Hehir that "never, before or since, would one man be such an overshadowing figure to the school". Hehir maintained a highly visible presence in the day-to-day life of the university, participating in and supporting college events, and taking personal interest in the lives of students. A popular legend of his presidency was that Father Hehir had two groups of student files: one for "those who can pay" and another for "those who cannot pay"; he was often willing to bankroll the education of talented students, confident that the school would be repaid later. His relationship with the deans of the schools was also notably good: all the founders of the various schools—except one—still headed those schools at the time of his retirement.

St. Martin's Hall, a 15-story high-rise residence hall for freshman students at Duquesne, was constructed in August 1962 and named after Father Hehir.

== Notes and references ==
Notes

Works cited

- "Alumni mourn Father Hehir". The Pittsburgh Post-Gazette. June 13, 1935.
- Leech, Edward T. (November 1, 1933). "Ex-Duquesne Head Will Be Honored". The Pittsburgh Press. Vol. 50, no. 131. Pittsburgh, Pennsylvania.
- Meagher, Jack (October 16, 1930). "Father Hehir Confirms Rumors of Resignation from Presidency". The Duquesne Duke. Vol. 7, no. 3. Pittsburgh, Pennsylvania: Duquesne University.
- Rishel, Joseph F.; Demilio, Paul (1997). "The Spirit That Gives Life": The History of Duquesne University, 1878-1996. Pittsburgh: Duquesne University Press. ISBN 0-8207-0268-4.
- Who Was Who in America with World Notables. Vol. 1. Marquis Who's Who, Inc. 1942.

Catholic Church titles
Preceded by Rev. John Tuohill Murphy	President of Pittsburgh Catholic College; President of Duquesne University; 1899–1930	Succeeded by Rev. Jeremiah Joseph Callahan
