= Nesti =

Nesti is an Italian surname. Notable people with the surname include:

- Donald S. Nesti (born 1936), American Roman Catholic priest
- Fulvio Nesti (1925–1996), Italian footballer
- Mauro Nesti (1935–2013), Italian racing driver
- Piergiorgio Nesti (1931–2009), Italian Roman Catholic archbishop

== See also ==
- Nestis
