= Bibliography of Edith Stein =

Edith Stein circa 1926

The following is a list of works by the German nun and philosopher Edith Stein (1891-1942), as well as scholarly sources related to her life and work.

== Works by Edith Stein ==
For a detailed chronology of Stein's writings, see the website of the International Association for the Study of the Philosophy of Edith Stein (IASPES).

=== In German ===
- 1917, Zum Problem der Einfühlung Halle: Buchdruckerei des Waisenhauses (doctoral thesis).
- 1916-1920, Einführung in die Philosophie, lectures taught at a proseminar in Freiburg in 1916–1918 and, later, privately in Breslau in Edith Stein House in 1920
- 1921, Freiheit und Gnade. This work has for years been wrongly identified and quoted as Die ontische Struktur der Person und ihre erkenntnistheoretische Problematik, a title that appeared in print after WWII due to an incorrect connection between title page and work.
- 1922, Beiträge zur philosophischen Begründung der Psychologie und der Geisteswissenschaften, in Jahrbuch für Philosophie und phänomenologische Forschung 5, Halle: Max Niemeyer, 1–284.
- 1924, Was ist Phänomenologie?
- 1924, Was ist Philosophie? Ein Gespräch zwischen Edmund Husserl und Thomas von Aquino
- 1925, Eine Untersuchung über den Staat, in Jahrbuch für Philosophie und phänomenologische Forschung 7, Halle: Max Niemeyer, 1–123.
- 1929, Husserls Phänomenologie und die Philosophie des heiligen Thomas von Aquino. Versuch einer Gegenüberstellung, in Festschrift Edmund Husserl zum 70. Geburtstag gewidmet, (Jahrbuch für Philosophie und phänomenologische Forschung 10), Ergänzungsband, Halle: Max Niemeyer, 315–338.
- 1930/1931, Die weltanschauliche Bedeutung der Phänomenologie
- 1931, Potenz und Akt. Studien zu einer Philosophie des Seins
- 1932, Der Aufbau der menschlichen Person. Vorlesung zur philosophischen Anthropologie
- 1933, Was ist der Mensch? Theologische Anthropologie. Das Menschenbild unseres Glaubens
- 1928–1933, Die Frau. Fragestellungen und Reflexionen
- 1935/1936, Endliches und ewiges Sein. Versuch eines Aufstiegs zum Sinn des Seins, written with two supplements:
  - Die Seelenburg zu Endliches und ewiges Sein
  - Martin Heidegger’s Existenzphilosophie
- 1940/1941, Wege der Gotteserkenntnis. Studie zu Dionysius Areopagita
- 1941/1942, Kreuzeswissenschaft. Studie über Johannes vom Kreuz
- 1962, Welt und Person (posthumous publication)

=== Contemporary critical edition ===
Edith Stein Gesamtausgabe, Herder 2000–2020, with English and Polish translations available:

- ESGA 1: Stein E., Aus dem Leben einer jüdischen Familie und weitere autobiographische Beiträge, Herder, Freiburg 2002.
  1. English translation: CWES 1: Life in a Jewish Family: Her Unfinished Autobiographical Account, trans. Josephine Koeppel in: The Collected Works of Edith Stein. Volume 1, ICS Publications, Washington D.C. 1986;
  2. Polish translation: ESGA PL 1: Dzieje pewnej rodziny żydowskiej, trans. Immakulata J. Adamska, Wydawnictwo Karmelitów Bosych, Cracow 2005.
- ESGA 2: Stein E., Selbstbildnis in Briefen I. Erster Teil 1916–1933, Herder, Freiburg 2000.
  1. English translation: CWES 5: Self-portrait in Letters 1916–1942, trans. Josephine Koeppel in: The Collected Works of Edith Stein. Volume 1, ICS Publications, Washington D.C. 1993.
  2. Polish translation: Autoportret z listów I, trans. Immakulata J. Adamska, Anna Talarek, Wydawnictwo Karmelitów Bosych, Cracow 2003.
- ESGA 3: Stein E., Selbstbildnis in Briefen II. Zweiter Teil 1933–1942, Herder, Freiburg 2000.
  1. Polish translation: ESGA PL 3: Autoportret z listów II, trans. Immakulata J. Adamska, Anna Talarek, Wydawnictwo Karmelitów Bosych, Cracow 2003.
- ESGA 4: Stein E., Selbstbildnis in Briefen III. Briefe an Roman Ingarden, Herder, Freiburg 2005.
  1. English translation: CWES 12: Self-Portrait in Letters, trans. Hugh Candler Hunt, ICS Publications, Washington D.C. 2001.
  2. Polish translation ESGA PL 4: Autoportret z listów. Cz. 3. Listy do Romana Ingardena trans. Małgorzata Klentak-Zabłocka, Andrzej Wajs, Wydawnictwo Karmelitów Bosych, Cracow 2003; an older Polish translation: PL 4: Spór o prawdę istnienia. Listy Edith Stein do Romana Ingardena, trans. Małgorzata Klentak-Zabłocka, Andrzej Wajs, Wydawnictwo M, Warsaw 1994.
- ESGA 5: Stein E., Zum Problem der Einfühlung, Herder, Freiburg-Basel-Wien 2008.
  1. English translation: CWES 3: On the problem of empathy, trans. Waltraut Stein, ICS Publications, Washington D.C. 1989.
  2. Polish translation: O zagadnieniu wczucia, trans. Danuta Gierulanka, Jerzy F. Gierula, Znak, Cracow 1988.
- ESGA 6: Stein E., Beiträge zur philosophischen Begründung der Psychologie und der Geisteswissenschaften, Herder, Freiburg-Basel-Wien 2010.
  1. English translation: CWES 7: Philosophy of Psychology and the Humanities, trans. Mary Catharine Baseheart, Marianne Sawicki, ICS Publications, Washington D.C. 2000;
  2. Polish translation: ESGA PL 6: Filozofia psychologii i humanistyki, trans. Piotr Janik SJ, Marcin Baran SJ, Jolanta Gaca, Wydawnictwo Karmelitów Bosych, Cracow 2016.
- ESGA 7: Stein E., Eine Untersuchung über den Staat, Herder, Freiburg-Basel-Wien 2006.
  1. English translation: CWES 10: An Investigation Concerning the State, trans. Marianne Sawicki, ICS Publication, Washington D.C. 2006.
- ESGA 8: Stein E., Einführung in die Philosophie, Herder, Freiburg-Basel-Wien 2004.
  1. No translation is available.
- ESGA 9: Stein E., ‘Freiheit und Gnade’ und weitere Beiträge zu Phänomenologie und Ontologie, Herder, Freiburg-Basel-Wien 2014.
  1. English translation: CWES 8: Husserl and Aquinas. A Comparison, in: CWES 8: Knowledge and Faith, trans. Walter Redmond, ICS Publications, Washington D.C. 2000, pp. 1–64. Older translation is available in: M. C. Baseheart, Person in the World: Introduction to the Philosophy of Edith Stein, Kluwer, Dordrecht 1997, pp. 129–144, transl. by M. C. Baseheart.
  2. Polish translation of Was Ist Philosophie? Ein Gespräch zwischen Edmund Husserl und Thomas von Aquino is Co to jest filozofia? Rozmowa między Edmundem Husserlem a Tomaszem z Akwinu, in: PL 9: Światło rozumu i wiary. Duchowa droga Edyty Stein św. Teresy Benedykty od Krzyża, Totaldruk, Poznań 2002, pp. 29–77.
- ESGA 10: Stein E., Potenz und Akt. Studien zu einer Philosophie des Seins, Herder, Freiburg-Basel-Wien 2005.
  1. English translation: CWES 11: Potency and Act, Studies Toward a Philosophy of Being, trans. Walter Redmond, ICS Publications, Washington D.C. 2009.
- ESGA 11/12: Stein E., Endliches und ewiges Sein. Versuch eines Aufstiegs zum Sinn des Seins. Anhang: Martin Heideggers Existenzphilosophie. Die Seelenburg, Herder, Freiburg-Basel-Wien 2006.
  1. English translation: CWES 9: Finite and eternal being, trans. K. F. Reinhardt, ICS Publications, Washington D.C. 2002.
  2. Polish translation: PL 11/12a: Byt skończony a byt wieczny, trans. Immakulata J. Adamska OCD, W drodze, Poznań 1995. The appendixes (Die Seelenburg and Martin Heideggers Existenzphilosophie) are translated in: PL 11/12b: Twierdza duchowa, trans. Immakulata J. Adamska, Zysk i S-ka, Poznań 2006, 93–122 and 135–203.
- ESGA 13: Stein E., Die Frau. Fragestellungen und Reflexionen, Freiburg-Basel-Wien 2000, Herder.
  1. English translation: CWES 2: The Collected Works of Edith Stein. Volume II. Essays on Woman, trans. F. M. Oben, Washington D.C. 1996, ICS Publications.
  2. Polish translation: ESGA PL 13: Kobieta. Pytania i refleksje, trans. Wiesław Szymona, Wydawnictwo Karmelitów Bosych, Cracow 2015.
- ESGA 14: Stein E., Der Aufbau der menschlichen Person. Vorlesung zum philosophischen Anthropologie, Freiburg-Basel-Wien 1994, Herder, Freiburg 2004.
  1. Polish translation: ESGA PL 14: Budowa osoby ludzkiej. Wykład z antropologii filozoficznej, trans. Grzegorz Sowinski, Wydawnictwo Karmelitów Bosych, Cracow 2015.
  2. Italian translation: La struttura della persona umana, trans. L. Gelber-M. Linssen, M. d'Ambra, Città Nuova, Rome 2000.
- ESGA 15: Stein E., Was is der Mensch? Theologische Anthropologie, Freiburg-Basel-Wien 2005, Herder.
  1. Polish translation: ESGA PL 15: Czym jest człowiek? Antropologia teologiczna, trans. Grzegorz Sowinski, Wydawnictwo Karmelitów Bosych, Cracow 2012.
- ESGA 16: Stein E., Bildung und Entfaltung der Individualität. Beiträge zum christlichen Erziehungsauftrag, Herder, Freiburg-Basel-Wien 2001.
- ESGA 17: Stein E., Wege der Gotteserkenntnis. Studie zu Dionysius Areopagita und Übersetzung seiner Werke, Herder, Freiburg-Basel-Wien 2013.
  1. Polish translation: Drogi poznania Boga: studium o Dionizym Areopagicie i przekład jego dzieł, trans. Grzegorz Sowinski, Wydawnictwo Karmelitów Bosych, Cracow 2006.
- ESGA 18: Kreuzeswissenschaft. Studie über Johannes vom Kreuz, Herder, Freiburg-Basel-Wien 2003.
  1. English translation: CWES 6: The Science of the Cross, trans. Josephine Koeppel, ICS Publications, Washington D.C. 2002;
  2. Polish translation: Wiedza Krzyża. Studium o św. Janie od Krzyża, trans. Immakulata J. Adamska, Grzegorz Sowinski, Wydawnictwo Karmelitów Bosych, Cracow 2013.
- ESGA 19: Geistliche Texte I, Freiburg-Basel-Wien 2009, Herder.
  1. English translation: The Hidden Life: Essays, Meditations, Spiritual Texts, trans. Waltraut Stein in: The Collected Works of Edith Stein. Volume IV, ICS Publications, Washington D.C. 2014.
- ESGA 20: Geistliche Texte II, Freiburg-Basel-Wien 2007, Herder.
  1. English translation: ESGA EN 4: The Hidden Life: Essays, Meditations, Spiritual Texts, trans. Waltraut Stein in: The Collected Works of Edith Stein. Volume IV, ICS Publications, Washington D.C. 2014.
- ESGA 21: Übersetzung von John Henry Newman, Die Idee der Universität, Freiburg-Basel-Wien 2014, Herder.
- ESGA 22: Übersetzung von John Henry Newman, Briefe und Texte zur ersten Lebenshälfte (1801–1846), Freiburg-Basel-Wien 2004, Herder.
- ESGA 23: Übersetzung: Des Hl. Thomas von Aquino Untersuchungen über die Wahrheit – Quaestiones disputatae de veritate 1, Freiburg-Basel-Wien 2014, Herder.
- ESGA 24: Übersetzung: Des Hl. Thomas von Aquino Untersuchungen über die Wahrheit – Quaestiones disputatae de veritate 2, Freiburg-Basel-Wien 2002, Herder.
- ESGA 25: Übersetzung von Alexandre Koyré, Descartes und die Scholastik, Freiburg-Basel-Wien 2008, Herder.
- ESGA 26: Übersetzung: Thomas von Aquin, Über das Seiende und das Wesen – De ente et essentia – mit den Roland-Gosselin-Exzerpten. Eingeführt und bearbeitet von Andreas Speer und Francesco Valerio Tommasi, Freiburg-Basel-Wien 2008, Herder.
- ESGA 27: Miscellanea thomistica, Freiburg-Basel-Wien 2013, Herder.

== Works about Edith Stein ==
- Berkman, Joyce A., ed. (2006). Contemplating Edith Stein. University of Notre Dame Press.
- Berkman, Joyce Avrech (2023). Edith Stein's Life in a Jewish family, 1891-1916: a companion. Lanham: Lexington Books. ISBN 9781666912494.
- Borden, Sarah R. (2003). Edith Stein (Outstanding Christian Thinkers). Continuum.
- Borden Sharkey, Sarah (2010). Thine own self: individuality in Edith Stein's later writings. Washington, D.C: Catholic University of America Press. ISBN 9780813216829.
- Calcagno, Antonio; Miron, Ronny, eds. (2022). Hedwig Conrad-Martius and Edith Stein: philosophical encounters and divides. Cham: Springer. ISBN 9783031147586.
- Calcagno, Antonio (2007). The Philosophy of Edith Stein. Duquesne University Press.
- Courtine-Denamy, Sylvie (2000). Three women in dark times: Edith Stein, Hannah Arendt, Simone Weil: or Amor fati, amor mundi. Ithaca, N.Y: Cornell University Press. ISBN 0801435722.
- Feldhay Brenner, Rachel (1997). Writing as resistance: four women confronting the Holocaust: Edith Stein, Simone Weil, Anne Frank, Etty Hillesum. University Park, Pa: Pennsylvania State University Press. ISBN 027101623X.
- Graef, Hilda C. (1955). The scholar and the cross: the life and work of Edith Stein. London, New York: Longmans Green.
- Herbsrith, Waltraud (1985). Edith Stein: a biography. San Francisco: Harper & Row. ISBN 0060638710.
- Lebech, Mette (Winter 2011). "Why Do We Need the Philosophy of Edith Stein?" (PDF). Communio. 38: 682–727. Archived (PDF) from the original on 1 July 2016.
- Lebech, Mette (2015). The Philosophy of Edith Stein: From Phenomenology to Metaphysics. Peter Lang.
- MacIntyre, Alasdair C. (2006). Edith Stein: A Philosophical Prologue, 1913–1922. Lanham, MD: Rowman & Littlefield.
- Maskulak, Marian, ed. 2016. Edith Stein: Selected Writings. New York: Paulist Press.
- Oben, Freda Mary (1988). Edith Stein: scholar, feminist, saint. New York: Alba House. ISBN 978-0818905230.
- Palmisano, Joseph (2013). Beyond the walls: Abraham Joshua Heschel and Edith Stein on the significance of empathy for Jewish-Christian dialogue. New York: Oxford University Press. ISBN 9780199925025.
- Posselt, Teresia Renata (1952). Edith Stein: The Life of a Philosopher and Carmelite. Sheed and Ward.
- Sawicki, Marianne (1997). Body, Text and Science: The Literacy of Investigative Practices and the Phenomenology of Edith Stein. Dordrecht: Kluwer.
- Sogos Wiquel, Giorgia. "L'incontro di due anime nella figura di Edith Stein". Toscana Ebraica. Bimestrale di Notizie e Cultura Ebraica. Firenze: Nova Arti Grafiche.
- Tyler, Peter (2023). The living philosophy of Edith Stein. New York: Bloomsbury Academic. ISBN 9781350265561.
