= John Tuohill Murphy =

Irish Roman Catholic priest (1854-1926)

John Tuohill Murphy, C.S.Sp.
- Bishop of Port-Louis
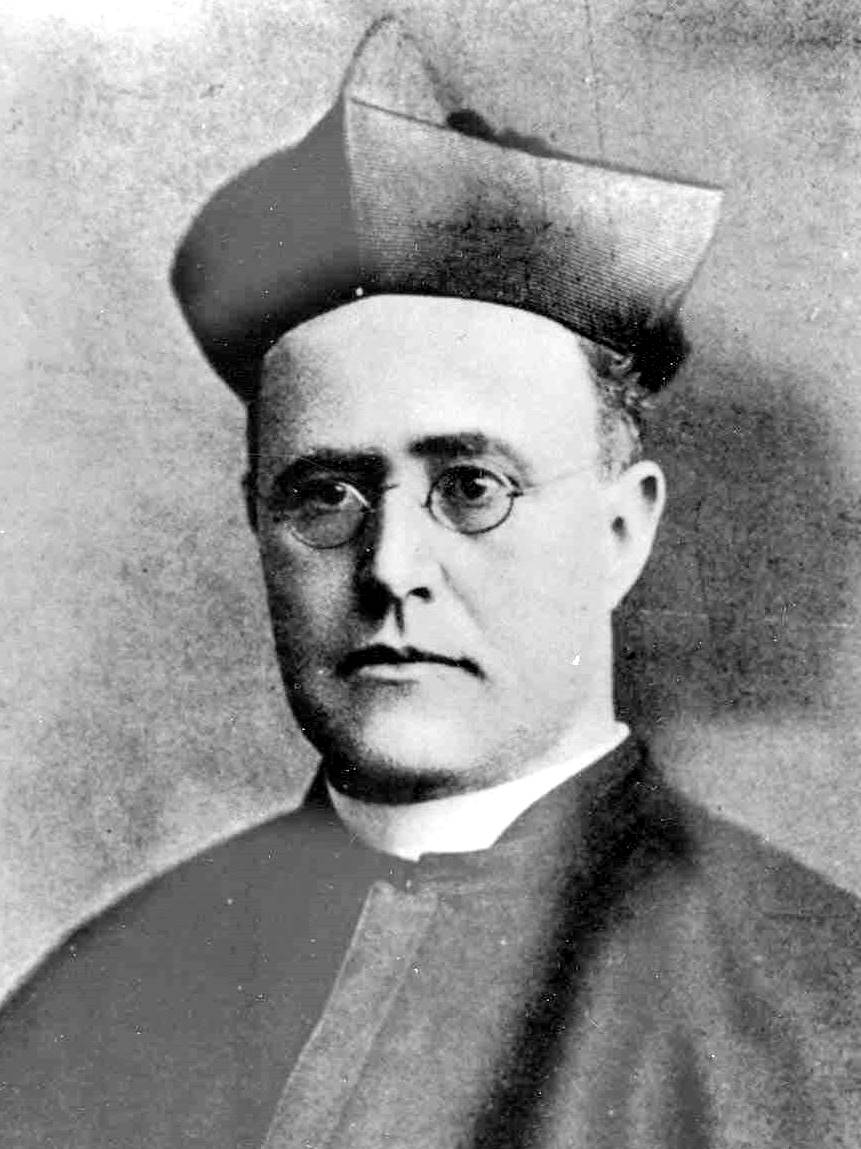
- Church: Roman Catholic Church
- In office: 8 July 1916 – 16 April 1926 (9 years, 9 months)
- Predecessor: Jacques Leen, C.S.Sp.
- Successor: James Bilsborrow, O.S.B.
- Previous posts: President of Pittsburgh Catholic College; 1886–1899 predecessor: John Willms successor: Martin Hehir

Orders
- Ordination: September 1878

Personal details
- Born: 24 June 1854 Meenbanivan (Castleisland), Ireland
- Died: 16 April 1926 (aged 71) Port Louis, Mauritius

John Baptist Tuohill Murphy, (Note: Murphy's middle name was a family name, and is variously spelled as Tuohy, Tuohill, and Toohill.) C.S.Sp. (24 June 1854 – 16 April 1926) was an Irish Roman Catholic priest in the Congregation of the Holy Ghost, who served from 1886 to 1899 as the president of the Pittsburgh Catholic College, which was later renamed Duquesne University in 1911 when it gained university status. Later, Murphy was consecrated as a bishop and administered the Roman Catholic Diocese of Port-Louis in Mauritius until his death.

== Early life ==
John Baptist Tuohill Murphy was born on 24 June 1854 in Meenbanivan, a village near Castleisland, in County Kerry, Ireland. He received a grounding in the Classics from his granduncle, Father James Tuohill, who was living at the time with the Murphy family. Murphy was introduced to the French College at Blackrock at the age of fourteen, where he made a name for himself as a debater and a contributor to the college's literary journal. He also won first prize for Greek and Latin verse.

In 1872, Murphy volunteered to answer a call for help at St. Mary's College in Trinidad. As a prefect at the college, "John T", as he was known, was entrusted with the top classes preparing for the Cambridge Local Examination. His success was such that he was kept on in that position for five and a half years. During his time at St. Mary's, he made a thorough self-study of theology and philosophy.

Murphy was ordained to the priesthood in September 1878, and made his profession in the Congregation of the Holy Ghost in December of that year. He was afterwards sent to Rockwell College, where he took charge of studies and discipline and remained for seven and a half years. During that time, his name was proposed for a Fellowship at the Royal University of Ireland by Archbishop Thomas Croke.

== Rector of Pittsburgh Catholic College ==
The success Murphy enjoyed in education at Blackrock inspired his assignment in 1886 to Pittsburgh, where he was sent to help the struggling Pittsburgh Catholic College of the Holy Ghost. Murphy was to remain at the college for thirteen years in the role of rector or president (the use of one title over the other was fairly contentious at the time).

Murphy was installed on 19 August 1886, and found staff morale dangerously low. A great issue of dissatisfaction was related to the school's curriculum. Although Murphy had been educated under a philosophy that stressed classical studies for the purpose of producing cultured gentlemen, he soon learned that the children of Pittsburgh's Catholic immigrants were not yet being admitted to the professions of law and medicine that merited this type of study. Rather, a college education was seen as upward mobility from manual labour to white-collar office jobs: thus, the "commercial" course had always been the most popular.

In response to this atmosphere, one of Murphy's first acts upon arriving to Pittsburgh was to conduct a survey of the students at the college. He concluded that more courses in physics and chemistry were needed, and established a well-appointed laboratory. Murphy enlarged the Classics and Commercial departments, and added courses in dramatics, debating, and elocution; the college's first bachelor's degrees were conferred in 1889. Murphy's great love of public speaking inspired him to personally direct a production of Euripides' Alcestis in the original Greek in 1891. Though that sort of production was not well-suited to Pittsburgh's working-class population, the play was a success, and earned the college $1,000—most likely because Murphy had decided to provide verbal introductions in English before each act.

Murphy's accomplishments included the 1887 establishment of an Association of Past Students, which became the predecessor to the Duquesne University Alumni Association. Another shrewd decision was made when the South Fork Hunting and Fishing Club's dam broke on the Conemaugh River in 1889, causing the Johnstown Flood. As a result, Pittsburgh's drinking water became even more undrinkable than usual. Murphy had a 150-foot (46 m) well dug behind the Administration Building in response, and the pump became a gathering place for students until it was capped in 1938.

Perhaps the most enduring symbol of Murphy's administration is Duquesne University's chapel. The Gothic Revival chapel was constructed in brick to match the adjoining the Administration Building; it was begun in 1893, but not finished until 1904. Murphy personally secured the relics of the martyred saint Romulus for placement under the high altar.

Murphy's term ended in 1899, but his presidency is credited with having laid the foundation for the successful administration of Father Martin Hehir, C.S.Sp., which saw the Pittsburgh Catholic College elevated to university status and renamed Duquesne University of the Holy Ghost in 1911.

== Activities in America and Ireland ==
Murphy serving as the superior of the Holy Ghost Fathers's community in Pittsburgh from 1893 to 1899, during which time he was much in demand as a lecturer on education. He made the acquaintance of many influential Catholic leaders in America: he was asked by Cardinal James Gibbons to open a school in Baltimore, and by Bishop Michael O'Connor to found one in Philadelphia. He assisted at the foundation of Catholic University in Washington, D.C. Further associations included Archbishop John Ireland of Saint Paul, Minnesota, and Mother Katharine Drexel, who was later to be canonised in 2000. Murphy made an attempt to convert Margaret Anna Cusack, called "the Nun of Kenmare", back to Catholicism in the last years of her life, but failed, to substantial public embarrassment. Overall, his last years in Pittsburgh were not peaceful, as the Spiritan community there was divided between the Irish and the Germans, and his "autocratic" approach did not mollify the tension.

The year 1899 saw Murphy return to Europe and accept an assignment as headmaster of his alma mater, Blackrock College. He attempted a foundation at Priors Park in Bath in 1904, but little came of this project. Nonetheless, he spent two years there, and was called on to lecture to the Catholic students at the University of Oxford, where his talk on theological modernism was well received.

Late in 1906, Murphy returned to America, as his confreres voted him their provincial. He subsequently founded the Holy Ghost Apostolic College—today known as Holy Ghost Preparatory School—in Cornwells Heights near Philadelphia, and constructed it in a style reminiscent of an Oxford college. During that time, Murphy renewed his acquaintance with Katharine Drexel and actively encouraged his congregation to take part in her parishes and projects.

Murphy was recalled once again to Ireland in 1910. In an effort to expand his activities there, he made a deal with the wealthy Mother Drexel—in return for money, he would send twenty Spiritan scholastics to help her in her ministry to America's African American population. The First World War, however, put obstacles in the way of his plans for expansion.

== Bishop of Port Louis ==
Pope Benedict XV accorded Murphy the rare honour of a Doctorate of Theology "Autodidactic" in 1916. In the same year, he was appointed the bishop of Port Louis, Mauritius. He was ordained to that bishopric in Dublin's pro-cathedral. Upon arriving in Mauritius, one of Murphy's first acts was to introduce the cause of canonisation for Father Jacques-Désiré Laval. In 1920, Murphy built a seminary at Quatre Bornes, which later became a lay college. As bishop, Murphy was especially noted for his concern for the poor and sick—he regularly visited the infirm in their homes and hospitals, and put pressure on municipal authorities to provide water and roads in poor areas. When his health began to fail, he requested a coadjutor bishop and was given Father James Leen, C.S.Sp. Murphy died in Port Louis on 16 April 1926, at the age of 71.

== Notes and references ==
Notes

Works cited

- Farragher, Seàn P (2006), Irish Spiritans Remembered, Part 1 (PDF), archived from the original (PDF) on 21 July 2011
- Rishel, Joseph F; Demilio, Paul (1997), "The Spirit That Gives Life": The History of Duquesne University, 1878–1996, Pittsburgh, Pennsylvania: Duquesne University Press, ISBN 0-8207-0268-4

Catholic Church titles
Preceded by Jacques Leen, C.S.Sp.	Bishop of Port Louis; 1916–1926	Succeeded by James Bilsborrow, O.S.B.
Preceded by John Willms, C.S.Sp.	President of Pittsburgh Catholic; College of the Holy Ghost; 1886–1899	Succeeded by Martin Hehir, C.S.Sp.
