= Erwin Straus =

American phenomenologist (1891–1975)

Erwin Walter Maximilian Straus (11 November 1891, Frankfurt am Main – 20 May 1975, Lexington, Kentucky) was a German-American phenomenologist and neurologist who helped to pioneer anthropological medicine and psychiatry, a holistic approach to medicine that is critical of mechanistic and reductionistic approaches to understanding and treating human beings.

Some of his work can also be regarded as a precursor to or early version of neurophenomenology. Straus taught at Black Mountain College.

His books published in English include:

- Phenomenology: Pure and Applied (1964, Duquesne University Press)
- Phenomenological Psychology (1966, Basic Books)
- Psychiatry and Philosophy (1969, Springer)
- Phenomenology of Memory (1970, Duquesne University Press)
- Language and Language Disturbances (1974, Duquesne University Press)
- Man, Time, and World: Two Contributions to Anthropological Psychology (1982, Humanities Press)
- On Obsession: A Clinical and Methodological Study (1987, Johnson Reprint Corp)

== Bibliography ==
- Zu Leben und Werk von Erwin Walter Maximilian Straus (1891-1975), by Franz Bossong (1991, Königshausen & Neumann)
