= Jeremiah J. Callahan =

American mathematician, Catholic priest and university administrator

Rev. Jeremiah J. Callahan, C.S.Sp.

Fifth President of Duquesne University of the Holy Ghost
- In office 1931–1940
- Preceded by: Rev. Martin A. Hehir
- Succeeded by: Rev. Raymond V. Kirk

Personal details
- Born: January 11, 1878 Bay City, Michigan
- Died: October 11, 1969 (aged 91)
- Education: Pittsburgh Catholic College; St. Vincent's Seminary; Holy Ghost Apostolic College; Pontifical Gregorian University

Jeremiah Joseph Callahan, C.S.Sp. (January 11, 1878 – October 11, 1969) was a Roman Catholic priest and the fifth president of Duquesne University in Pittsburgh, from 1931 until 1940.

== Personal background ==
Callahan was born in Michigan in 1878. He was a graduate of the Duquesne University Prep School, (Note: In its early days, Duquesne University could not depend on a reliable stream of students from diocesan high schools, and so maintained a high school—the Duquesne Preparatory School—in formal affiliation with the university. The school closed in the spring of 1941.) and of the university itself, though at the time of his graduation in 1897 it was still known as the Pittsburgh Catholic College. After his graduation, he studied for the priesthood at St. Vincent's Seminary in Latrobe, Pennsylvania. His post-graduate work included study at the Holy Ghost Apostolic College (now Holy Ghost Preparatory School) in Cornwall Heights, Pennsylvania, and the Pontifical Gregorian University in Rome. After his ordination in 1904, he taught languages for a year at Duquesne University, was briefly appointed an instructor of philosophy and theology at the Ferndale Holy Ghost Seminary in Norwalk, Connecticut, and then served as the pastor of a church in Chippewa Falls, Wisconsin, for seven years. After that assignment, he was appointed head of the Holy Ghost Apostolic College in 1916, a role he filled for fifteen years.

== President of Duquesne University ==
Callahan formally succeeded Martin Hehir as president of Duquesne University on January 4, 1931. He promptly greeted a throng of newspaper reporters by explaining his personal critique of Einstein's theory of relativity. (Note: The Duquesne Duke reported the story: "Pittsburgh newspapers pounced upon a hot tip that the new president fails to agree with Einstein and his Theory of Relativity. When reporters asked Father Callahan to explain his attitude on the theory, he smiled quietly and began. 'Einstein's theory is based on a non-Euclidian [sic] postulate of geometry, first formulated early in the nineteenth century, which affirms that all lines meet. Euclid's fifth postulate, never proved, affirms that if two straight lines are cut by a transversal, and if the sum of the angles formed by the transversal with the straight lines is less than two right angles, the lines will meet, if produced indefinitely.' Startled reporters begged the president to stop a minute. Several asked him to repeat. After a minute, he continued: 'This is the theory taught in our schools and colleges today, with which I agree and Einstein does not'".) Inaugural ceremonies were held in Oakland's Soldiers and Sailors Memorial Hall on April 30, 1931. In his inaugural address, he set forth a theory of education that was very different from that of his predecessor. Hehir had taken a college that focused on a classical approach to education, surveyed the needs of the Catholic immigrant community in Pittsburgh, and transformed Duquesne University into a school with an emphasis on occupational training and practicality in curriculum. Callahan, on the other hand, believed that liberal education should "lead to the possession of manners and the mental attitude of a gentleman, the complete and perfectly rounded out man of the world". (Note: In contrast to that attitude, a 1937 poll of Duquesne University alumni revealed that 95 percent believed that "a college education [ought to] be supplemented with a little technical training".)

Although Callahan was hand-picked for the position by Hehir, Duquesne historian Joseph Rishel calls Callahan "an unfortunate choice". The onset of the Great Depression had a negative impact on the university's fortunes, and Callahan's impersonal and rigid administrative attitude only exacerbated the crisis. Moreover, he was uninterested in day-to-day decision making, instead outsourcing authority to the deans of the individual schools, who operated with virtual autonomy. He habitually took two-month "sabbaticals", even in the middle of the school year, and did not associate with the other Spiritan priests living on campus—he chose instead to live in a private apartment he had constructed adjoining the Administration Building. His inflexible attitude was summed up by one of his confrères in the congregation: "Father Callahan was the one man I knew who never had a doubt".

=== Conflict and resignation ===
By 1936, Callahan's "disregard of constitutional safeguards" had resulted in all-time low morale among university staff, and the bishop of Pittsburgh, as well as a number of parents, were rapidly losing confidence in his leadership. Callahan had privately conceded to the demands of Father Christopher J. Plunkett, the American Provincial of the Holy Ghost Fathers, and vowed to resign after returning from his February sabbatical. Indeed, his departure was covered by the Duquesne Duke, amid rumors of "shakeups in the administration". Two weeks into Callahan's absence, Father H. J. Goebel, the university's vice-president and treasurer, resigned. W. S. York Critchley, a man whom Callahan had appointed to be dean of the School of Education, followed suit, as it had been revealed that his academic credentials were forged.

In light of these scandals, Callahan announced his resignation when he arrived back in Pittsburgh in May 1936. He then promptly changed his mind. Plunkett responded by firing him from the office of president, but Callahan ignored the order and simply remained in office, claiming that only the board of directors had the authority to remove him. A meeting of the board in June failed to oust Callahan with a vote by secret ballot, and so Callahan hung on to the office for another four years.

Callahan's term came to an end when Plunkett died in 1939. Father George J. Collins was appointed American provincial, and transferred Callahan to St. Augustine's, a poor rural African-American parish located 10 miles outside of Natchitoches, Louisiana, on the Cane River. Callahan resigned at last in February 1940, in order to "bring this internal dissatisfaction to an end". He remained at St. Augustine until his death in 1969, becoming a well-known figure in Central Louisiana.

During Callahan's ten-year term as president, the university's curriculum grew to include day sessions in the School of Liberal Arts and Sciences, as well as in pharmacy, accounting, pre-medical and pre-dental studies, oratory, and music and drama. The university took over supervision of Mount Mercy College for Women (today Carlow University), and athletic programs were expanded. (When asked if he wasn't overemphasizing athletics, Callahan responded, "The Greeks of Homer's time trained more rigorously than football players of today".)

His successor was Father Raymond V. Kirk.

== Mathematical work ==
Callahan was an academic who studied Euclidean geometry. The first volume of his book Euclid or Einstein? A Proof of the Parallel Theory and a Critique of Metageometry claimed to have proved Euclid's fifth "parallel" postulate, by re-ordering the logical structure of Euclid's Elements. Callahan proved that for any point not on a given line, there exists a parallel line in the plane so determined and through the point that does not intersect the given line. Euclidean geometry requires the existence of a unique parallel line satisfying the specified conditions--which Callahan did not prove. The second volume purported to refute the theory of relativity.

== Life after Duquesne ==
Callahan served as a pastor in Louisiana until the late 1950s. He died on October 11, 1969, at the age of 91, and is buried in Sacred Heart Cemetery in Morrilton, Arkansas.

== Notes and references ==
Notes

Works cited

- Kunkel, J. Robert (February 13, 1936), "President Callahan Sails for Europe: Cordial Bon Voyage Dinner Seen as Stem to Rumors of Shakeup in Administration", The Duquesne Duke, vol. XI, no. 17, Pittsburgh, Pennsylvania: Duquesne University
- Meagher, Jack (January 7, 1931), "Rev. M. A. Hehir Retires After 31 Years Spent Here: "Interviews" First Act of New Head: Discusses Einstein Theory", The Duquesne Duke, vol. VII, no. 13, Pittsburgh, Pennsylvania: Duquesne University
- Rishel, Joseph F.; Demilio, Paul (1997), The Spirit That Gives Life: The History of Duquesne University, 1878–1996, Pittsburgh, Pennsylvania: Duquesne University Press, ISBN 0-8207-0268-4
- Walsh, Edward P. (February 6, 1940), "Board Officials Meet to Name New President", The Duquesne Duke, vol. XVI, no. 17, Pittsburgh, Pennsylvania: Duquesne University

Catholic Church titles
Preceded by Rev. Martin Hehir	President of Duquesne University; 1931–1940	Succeeded by Rev. Raymond V. Kirk
