= James Devlin =

James Devlin may refer to:

- Devlin (rapper) (born 1989), UK rapper
- James Devlin (priest), American Jesuit priest
- James Devlin (Oz), fictional character on the HBO drama Oz
- Jim Devlin (1849–1883), American baseball player accused of throwing games
- Jim Devlin (pitcher) (1866–1900), American baseball pitcher
- Jim Devlin (catcher) (1922–2004), American baseball catcher
- James Develin (born 1988), American football fullback
