= Francis P. Smith (Duquesne University) =

American Roman Catholic priest and university president (1907–1990)

Rev. Francis P. Smith, C.S.Sp.

Seventh President of Duquesne University of the Holy Ghost
- In office 1946–1950
- Preceded by: Rev. Raymond V. Kirk
- Succeeded by: Rev. Vernon F. Gallagher

Personal details
- Born: March 28, 1907 Waterbury, Connecticut
- Died: June 30, 1990 (aged 83) Pittsburgh, Pennsylvania
- Education: Duquesne University (B.A.); St. Mary's Seminary (B.D.); Catholic University of America (M.A.)

Francis P. Smith, C.S.Sp. (1907–1990) was a Roman Catholic priest and the seventh president of Duquesne University in Pittsburgh, from 1946 until 1950.

== Personal background and education ==
Francis P. Smith was born on March 28, 1907, in Waterbury, Connecticut, the son of Matthew Smith and his wife, Elizabeth A. Smith (née Begnal). Smith joined the Holy Ghost Fathers as a junior seminarian at the age of 13. He made his profession in the order on August 15, 1926.

He obtained a Bachelor of Arts degree from Duquesne University in 1930. He was ordained a priest on September 14, 1933, at St. Mary's Seminary in Norwalk, Connecticut, where he went on to obtain a bachelor of divinity in 1934. Father Smith taught as a professor at St. Mary's from 1934 until 1937, when he left for The Catholic University of America. He earned a Master of Arts degree from that institution in 1938.

== Service to Duquesne University ==
Smith had begun postgraduate work for a doctorate at Fordham University in 1938, but his studies were interrupted when he received an assignment to teach philosophy at Duquesne in 1940. He was named Dean of the College of Liberal Arts and Sciences in 1943, and Vice President of the university in 1944.

In 1946, Smith was appointed the seventh President of Duquesne University. He would serve in that position until 1950, when he was appointed coordinator of Spiritan educational activities in the United States.

An obituary in the Pittsburgh Post-Gazette noted that Smith's presidency "guided the university through a major post-World War II expansion fed by the influx of veterans studying under the G.I. Bill" and "supervised an expansion of the school's physical plant, improvements in faculty benefits and the founding of WDUQ, the city's first college radio station".

Smith died in Pittsburgh on June 30, 1990, at the age of 83. Before his death, he resided at the Holy Ghost Animation Center in the Pittsburgh suburb of Bethel Park.

== Notes and references ==
Works cited

- "A Formative Figure at Duquesne". Pittsburgh Post-Gazette. July 6, 1990. p. 6.
- "Obituary: Rev. F. Smith, Ex-President of Duquesne". Pittsburgh Post-Gazette. July 3, 1990. p. D6.
- Rishel, Joseph F.; Demilio, Paul (1997), "The Spirit That Gives Life": The History of Duquesne University, 1878-1996, Pittsburgh, Pennsylvania: Duquesne University Press, ISBN 0-8207-0268-4
- The American Catholic Who's Who. Vol. 14. Walter Romig. 1960–1961. p. 429.

Catholic Church titles
Preceded by Rev. Raymond V. Kirk	President of Duquesne University; 1946–1950	Succeeded by Rev. Vernon F. Gallagher
