= John Willms =

German Roman Catholic priest (1849–1914)

Rev. John S. Willms, C.S.Sp.
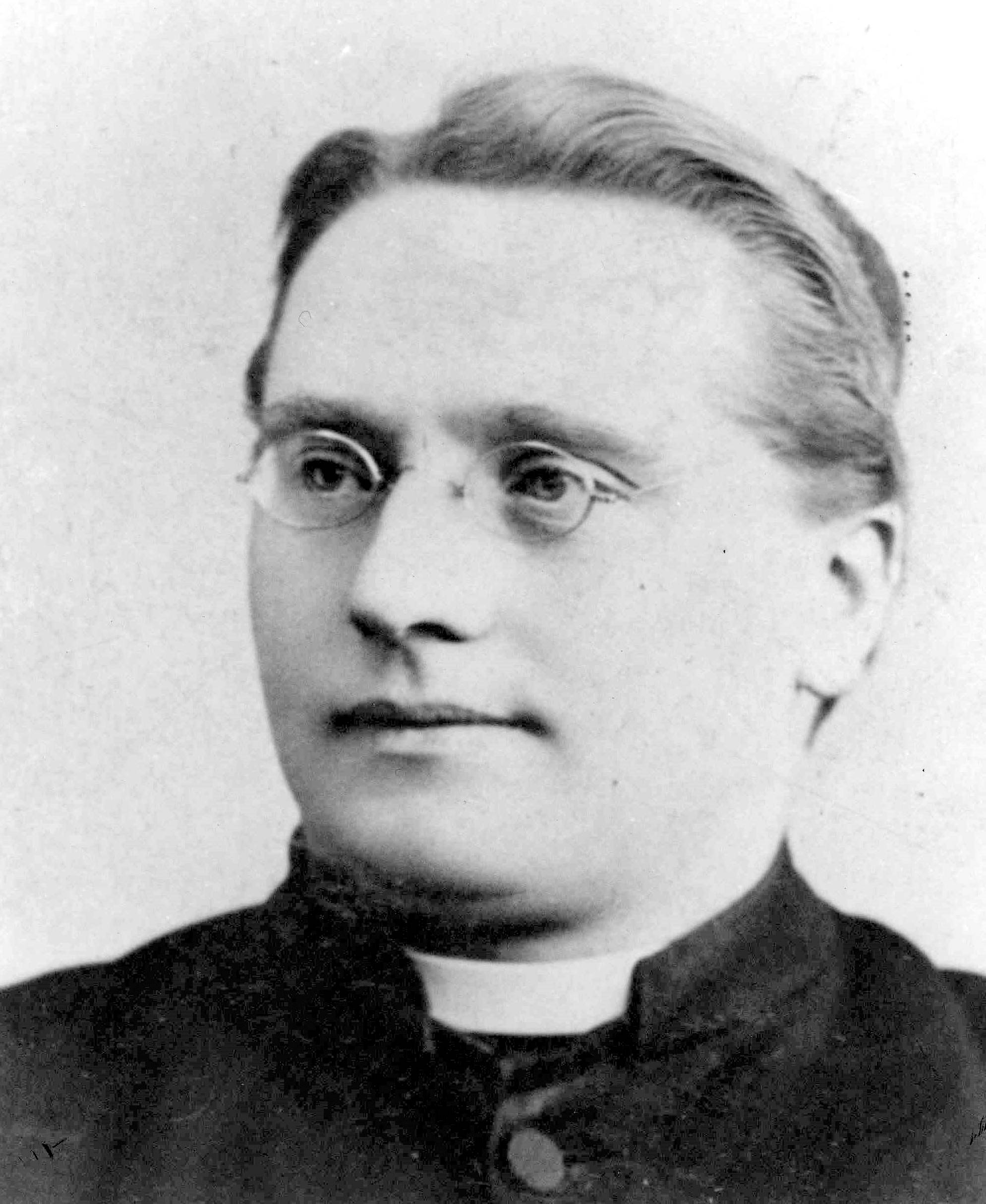

2nd Rector of the Pittsburgh Catholic College
- In office 1885–1886
- Preceded by: Rev. William P. Power
- Succeeded by: Rev. John T. Murphy

Personal details
- Born: March 22, 1849; Nideggen, Germany
- Died: January 3, 1914 (aged 63); Pittsburgh, Pennsylvania

John S. Willms, C.S.Sp. (March 22, 1849 – January 3, 1914) was a German Roman Catholic priest in the Congregation of the Holy Ghost. He worked in a missionary capacity among the Catholic population in the United States, serving as the second rector of the Pittsburgh Catholic College of the Holy Ghost in Pittsburgh, Pennsylvania (known today as Duquesne University), and as the director of the Holy Childhood Association in America.

== Biography ==
=== Early life ===
John Willms was born to a large family in Nideggen, a town near Cologne, Germany. Three of his brothers joined the Congregation of the Holy Ghost: Marie Antoine and Damase were both professed brothers in the order, and another died as a seminarian. Willms made preparatory studies for the priesthood in Marienstatt (Hachenburg), though because of the Kulturkampf and the subsequent expulsion of the Holy Ghost Fathers from Germany, he finished those studies in France.

=== Missionary service in America ===
In 1876 or 1877, after his ordination, he was sent to the United States, where he performed various pastoral duties in Morrilton, Arkansas and Sharpsburg, Pennsylvania, a community near Pittsburgh.

Willms succeeded Father William Patrick Power as the second rector of the Pittsburgh Catholic College in 1885. Willms led the fledgling college for a single year, before being transferred to a parish in Pittsburgh's suburb of Millvale.

Subsequently, Willms was one of two delegates from the American Province of the Holy Ghost Fathers to attend their General Chapter meeting in 1896; in 1897 he was appointed to the office of National Director of the Association of the Holy Childhood, a Catholic children's association for the benefit of foreign missions.

Willms narrowly avoided an untimely death in 1898. He had planned to take the steamer La Bourgogne to Paris to attend a meeting of the Holy Childhood Association, but when he arrived at the dock it was discovered that his second-class seat had been erroneously given to another passenger. Willms was offered a first-class cabin, but he considered that level of luxury incompatible with his vow of poverty, and he decided to wait for another ship. It was to be the La Bourgogne's last voyage; the vessel collided with the British ship Cromartyshire, with near complete loss of life. Since Willm's name had still been on the ship's passenger list, his fellow priests assumed he had perished in the disaster. They had already offered masses for the repose of his soul before he was able to make it known that he was, in fact, alive.

Willms died at Mercy Hospital in Pittsburgh on January 3, 1914, at the age of 63.

== Personality ==
Two anecdotes illustrating Willms's personality were remembered in the February 1941 edition of the American Province of the Congregation of the Holy Ghost's monthly bulletin:

As director of the Holy Childhood Association, Willms resided in the rectory of St. Stanislaus Church. A Polish prelate was visiting from Rome one Sunday, and had decided to give a sermon. A locomotive, however, arrived on the tracks outside the church and began to shift its cars back and forward, completely drowning out the speaker's words. Willms left the church immediately and stood on the tracks, refusing to let the engineer pass with the noisy train until the sermon was finished.

The other story relates how Willms suffered from a diabetic disease in his later years. When his toe became gangrenous, his doctor reportedly told him, "Your Reverence, your big toe has to be amputated in order to save your life." Willm's answer was spontaneous: "Father Willms will die with his toe!"

== Notes and references ==
Works cited

- "Lest We Forget: Father John Willms", Our Province, vol. IX, no. 2, Holy Ghost Fathers of the Province of the United States, February 1941
- "Requiescant in Pace", Our Province, vol. XVIII, no. 1, Holy Ghost Fathers of the Province of the United States, January 1949
- Rishel, Joseph F.; Demilio, Paul (1997), "The Spirit That Gives Life": The History of Duquesne University, 1878-1996, Pittsburgh, Pennsylvania: Duquesne University Press, ISBN 0-8207-0268-4

Catholic Church titles
Preceded by Rev. William P. Power	Rector of Pittsburgh Catholic; College of the Holy Ghost; 1885–1886	Succeeded by Rev. John T. Murphy
