= William Patrick Power =

First head of Duquesne University (1843–1919)

Rev. William P. Power, C.S.Sp.
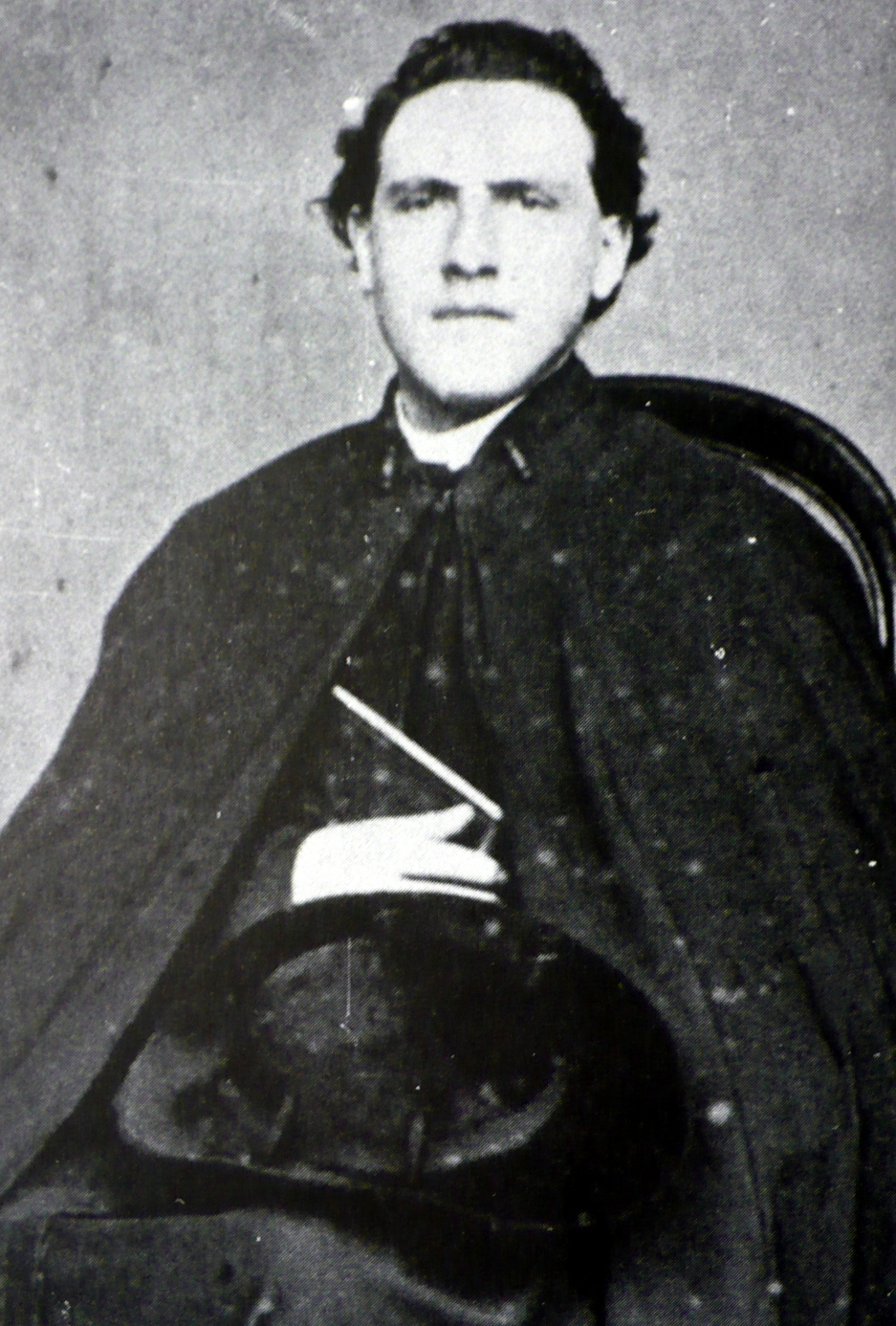

1st Rector of the Pittsburgh Catholic College
- In office 1878–1885
- Succeeded by: Rev. John Willms

Personal details
- Born: 1843 Ireland
- Died: 1919 (aged 75–76)

William Patrick Power, C.S.Sp. (1843–1919) was the first head of Duquesne University, founded as the "Pittsburgh Catholic College of the Holy Ghost". Power was born in 1843 and ordained in 1866; he had spent many years teaching in Spiritan missions in India, Mauritius and Trinidad before coming to Pittsburgh, Pennsylvania.

== First rector of Pittsburgh Catholic College ==
Father Joseph Strub, the founder of the College, was not happy with the Spiritan Superior General's choice of Father Power as the first rector of the Pittsburgh Catholic College, since he believed Pittsburgh's immigrant Catholics would perceive a German rector as more industrious and disciplined than an Irish one. In fact, he specifically requested that the rector not be Power, but he was selected nonetheless.

While the German Holy Ghost Father John Bernard Graff served in Power's capacity as he traveled from Ireland, the Irish-born bishop of Pittsburgh, John Tuigg, showed his animosity for the interim rector's nationality and offered little support for the newly established institution, even refusing the Holy Ghost Fathers the right to exercise priestly functions at the College, such as saying Mass or hearing confessions. Father Strub left two weeks after the College was opened on October 1, 1878 for Arkansas, eager to avoid further provoking Bishop Tuigg.

Power was rector during an essential and formative stage of Duquesne University's history: he was in office when the College received its state charter on July 7, 1882, and as the Old Main administration building was built on Boyd's Hill overlooking the Monongahela River. The "Victorian Medievalistic" structure was at that time the highest point on Pittsburgh's skyline.

Father Power's tenure was brief. Only two months after the administration building was dedicated in April 1884, Power was assigned to St. Mary College in Trinidad. He was succeeded by the German-born Father John Willms.

== Power Center ==
On 14 March 2006 Duquesne University began construction on a 130,000-square-foot (12,000 m^{2}) facility named in honor of Father Power. The building dedicates 80,000 square feet (7,400 m^{2}) to fitness facilities, and also includes a Barnes & Noble branch and a casual dining restaurant. The Power Center officially opened at the beginning of the Spring 2008 semester.

== Notes and references ==
Works cited

- "Fitness Facilities, Restaurants and Retail", Power Center, Duquesne University, 2010
- Rishel, Joseph F.; Demilio, Paul (1997), "The Spirit That Gives Life": The History of Duquesne University, 1878–1996, Pittsburgh, Pennsylvania: Duquesne University Press, ISBN 0-8207-0268-4
- Spiritan Campus Ministry bulletin, Duquesne University, 28 January 2008

Catholic Church titles
Preceded by —	Rector of the Pittsburgh Catholic College; 1878–1885	Succeeded by Rev. John Willms
