= Henry J. McAnulty =

American Catholic priest and university president

Rev. Henry J. McAnulty, C.S.Sp.

Ninth President of Duquesne University of the Holy Ghost
- In office 1959–1980
- Preceded by: Rev. Vernon F. Gallagher
- Succeeded by: Rev. Donald S. Nesti

Personal details
- Born: April 25, 1915 Pittsburgh, Pennsylvania, U.S.
- Died: June 10, 1995 (aged 80) Pittsburgh, Pennsylvania, U.S.
- Education: Duquesne University (B.A., 1936); St. Mary's Seminary (D.D., 1940)

Henry Joseph McAnulty, C.S.Sp. (April 25, 1915 – June 10, 1995) was an American Catholic priest. A Spiritan, McAnulty served as the ninth president of Duquesne University in Pittsburgh, Pennsylvania, from 1959 until 1980, and afterwards as university chancellor until his death.

== Life ==
=== Early years and education ===
Henry McAnulty was born on April 25, 1915, in the Shadyside neighborhood of Pittsburgh, Pennsylvania. He attended high school at Central Catholic High School in Oakland, graduating in 1932.

McAnulty earned his bachelor's degree at Duquesne University, majoring in philosophy and English with no intention of becoming a Holy Ghost Father. Following his graduation in 1936, however, he entered St. Mary's Holy Ghost Seminary in Norwalk, Connecticut, where he earned a bachelor of divinity. He was ordained a priest in 1940. McAnulty entered the Air Force as a military chaplain during World War II and served for fifteen years, retiring with the rank of lieutenant colonel. (He stayed in the reserves, and was later promoted to the rank of brigadier general; he was the first Catholic chaplain to be accorded such an honor.)

McAnulty returned to Duquesne in October 1958 by the invitation of President Vernon F. Gallagher. He served in the capacity of assistant to the president for less than a year before being appointed president himself.

=== Service to Duquesne University ===
Known on campus as "Father Mac", McAnulty cultivated an image of accessibility and community involvement during his 21 years as university president unrivaled since the days of Father Martin Hehir ("Daddy Hehir"). This approach was necessary for two reasons: McAnulty had to live up to the reputation that Father Gallagher, his predecessor, had enjoyed, and also because the university itself had to have a highly visible public face in order to achieve its fundraising goals for campus expansion and development. McAnulty's non-confrontational personality and ability to relate to students would save Duquesne University from much of the student unrest that characterized college campuses in the late 1960s.

==== Years of expansion (1959–1968) ====
McAnulty's first decade in service to Duquesne was characterized by a feeling of optimism for the future, as he worked to fulfill Father Gallagher's "Master Plan" for redevelopment of the university campus. Numerous large building projects were completed, starting with the renovation of the "Old Main" administration building from 1961 to 1966. This project was quickly followed by a large addition to the university library in the same year, as well as the purchase and renovation of a new academic building on Stevenson Street.

A top priority for campus development was the construction of residence halls as Duquesne transitioned from being a nearly-exclusively commuter college to hosting out-of-state and even international students. To this end, McAnulty made good on his promise to construct a dormitory for men, breaking ground on St. Martin Hall in 1962. St. Ann Hall, a dormitory for both men and women, was finished in two parts from 1963 to 1964. Construction was also begun in 1969 on a large, 17-story dormitory facility, which would later be named Duquesne Towers. These building projects, which expanded Duquesne's campus to occupy several blocks in Pittsburgh's Bluff neighborhood, met with some opposition from area residents, who felt that Duquesne's expansion was a "conspiracy" designed to throw them out of their homes. Financial settlements were made and construction continued.

Dormitory facilities were not the only projects underway at Duquesne. The Student Union, controversial for its poured-concrete ramps and large, plate glass windows, was designed by Paul Schweiker, a professor of architecture at the Carnegie Technical Institute, with groundbreaking taking place in 1964. The construction of Mellon Hall, a new, state-of-the-art science facility designed by Ludwig Mies van der Rohe, was completed in 1969. In addition, Vickroy Street was closed to car traffic and became the Academic Walk, landscaped promenade that cuts through the heart of campus today.

The year 1968 ended on a positive note for Duquesne University. Enrollment was at 7,428, and the slew of campus construction projects made it seem that Duquesne was posed for great things.

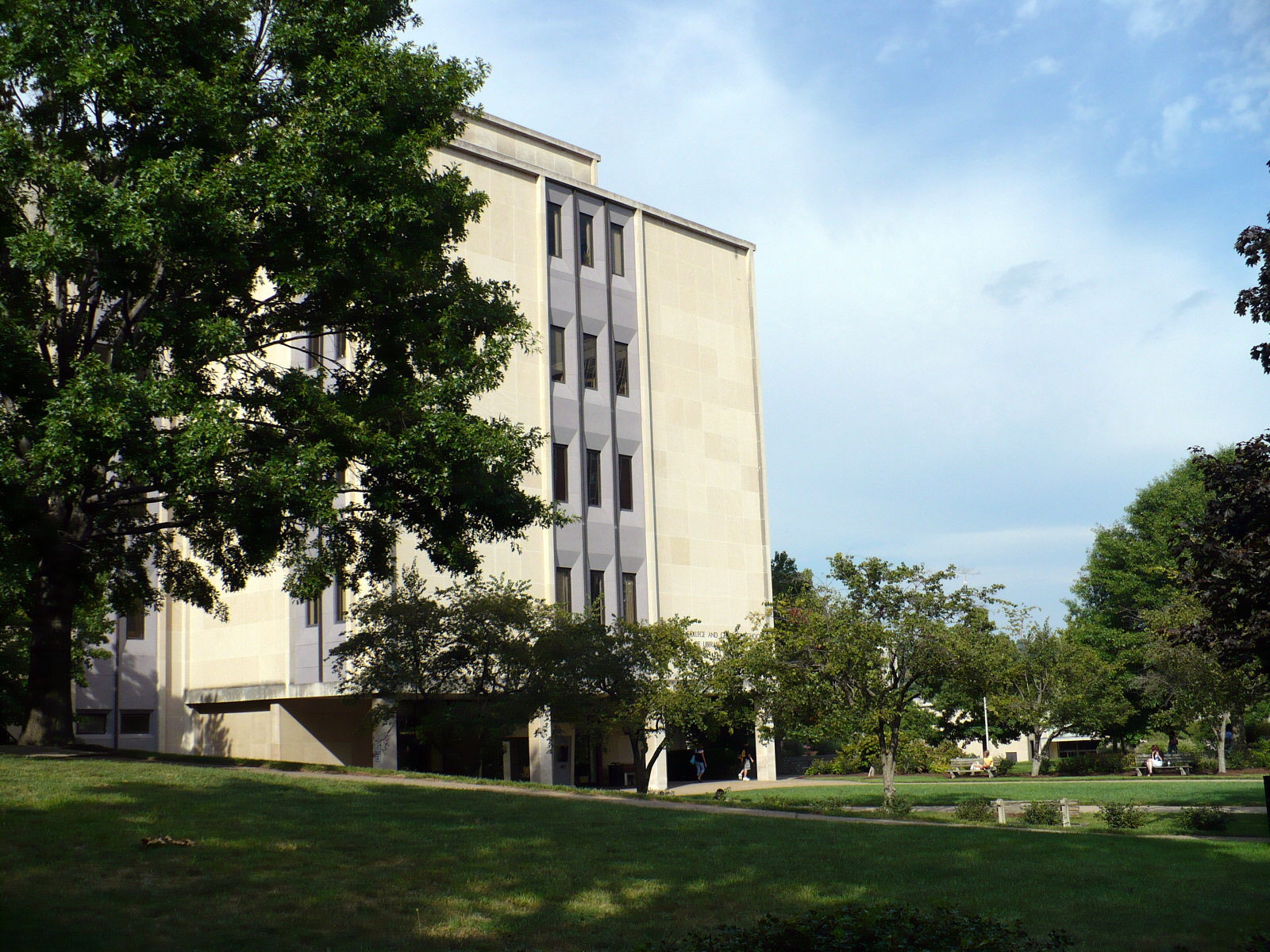
College Hall, home to the McAnulty College and Graduate School of Liberal Arts, named in McAnulty's honor after his death in 1995.

==== Financial woes (1969–1977) ====
Thanks to McAnulty's leadership, Duquesne experienced a decade of enthusiastic growth, and the contours of Duquesne's present-day campus began to take shape. Despite the large-scale accomplishments, however, financial complications were imminent which would take a toll on both the university's plans and McAnulty's health.

Two large building projects were direct contributors to the university's financial problems. First, Duquesne Towers, the 17-story, 1,200-bed dormitory, cost $10.5 million to construct. A loan had to be taken to cover the costs, and despite recommendations that had been given to McAnulty and the university administration, there was no immediate demand for its space. It would not be until 1992 that the dorm would be at full capacity. The other project was the $3.5 million refurbishment of a parking garage into College Hall, today the home of Duquesne's College of Liberal Arts.

Also a factor was that the University of Pittsburgh had just become a public university; as such, its tuition dropped astronomically in just one year. Other universities, such as Point Park and CCAC were also opening in the area and positioning themselves as competition to Duquesne.

By December 1969, it was revealed that Duquesne had $50,000 in available funds, and about $1,397,000 due for employee payroll and construction invoices. McAnulty decided to publicly acknowledge the situation, cancelling classes on April 21, 1970, to announce the situation to the entire student body. McAnulty presented two options: students would have to accept a $400 increase in tuition or the university would have to close. The student body, however, united to create a campaign which they dubbed the "Third Alternative." With the goal of raising one million dollars to "Save Duquesne University", students engaged in door-to-door fundraising and even a marathon race to raise funds. In the end, nearly $600,000 was gathered, enough to keep Duquesne afloat until the end of the crisis in 1973. McAnulty's leadership was largely credited with keeping the university community together during the financial crisis. In the words of Third Alternative student chairman Patrick Joyce, "[McAnulty] was a man who got people to pull together, not pull apart."

The stress of these financial pressures, as well as mounting divisiveness in the university administration, culminated in McAnulty taking a one-year sabbatical for health reasons from 1976 to 1977.

==== Renewed hope for Duquesne (1977–1980) ====
McAnulty came back from his sabbatical in good spirits, finding the university in a firmer position than it had been six years prior. He was able to bring his presidency to close on a positive note, overseeing the construction of a brand-new library facility, today the Gumberg Library, in 1978. An old paper mill, at that time in use as a parking garage, was remodeled for $5.2 million into a spacious library space.

McAnulty tendered his resignation in May 1979, agreeing to stay on until a replacement could be found. This replacement was found in Father Donald S. Nesti, and McAnulty stepped down from the university presidency in July 1980.

=== After Duquesne ===
Upon McAnulty's retirement, he was promptly elected to the position of university chancellor by the board of directors, a position usually reserved for the Bishop of Pittsburgh. Still immensely popular with the student body, Colbert Street was renamed to "McAnulty Street" in his honor on the occasion of the fiftieth anniversary of his ordination in 1990.

McAnulty died on June 10, 1995, after celebrating a wedding Mass in the university chapel. Returning to Trinity Hall, the priests' residence on campus, he suffered a massive heart attack.

== Legacy ==
At McAnulty's funeral Mass at Saint Paul's Cathedral, the serving president, Dr. John E. Murray, Jr., remarked, "He was the president of Duquesne University. He will always be the president of Duquesne University."

The College of Liberal Arts was renamed the McAnulty College of Liberal Arts just months after his death. Today, two endowed scholarships are offered by the university in his memory.

== Notes and references ==
Works cited

- Althouse, Daniel (April 22, 2010), "DU recalls financial recovery", The Duquesne Duke, Duquesne University, archived from the original on October 2, 2011
- Hall of Fame, Central Catholic High School, archived from the original on July 8, 2011
- "Endowed Scholarships", Alumni & Giving, Duquesne University, archived from the original on May 1, 2011
- Rishel, Joseph F.; Demilio, Paul (1997), "The Spirit That Gives Life": The History of Duquesne University, 1878-1996, Pittsburgh, Pennsylvania: Duquesne University Press, ISBN 0-8207-0268-4

Catholic Church titles
Preceded by Rev. Vernon F. Gallagher	President of Duquesne University; 1959–1980	Succeeded by Rev. Donald S. Nesti
