= Raymond V. Kirk =

Rev. Raymond V. Kirk, C.S.Sp.

Sixth President of Duquesne University of the Holy Ghost
- In office 1940–1946
- Preceded by: Rev. Jeremiah J. Callahan
- Succeeded by: Rev. Francis P. Smith

Personal details
- Born: May 3, 1901 Mount Pleasant, Pennsylvania
- Died: May 27, 1947 (aged 46) Ferndale, Connecticut
- Education: Duquesne University (B.A.); New York University (Ph.D.)

Raymond V. Kirk, C.S.Sp. (1901–1947) was a Roman Catholic priest and the sixth president of Duquesne University in Pittsburgh, from 1940 until 1946.

== Personal background ==
Raymond Kirk was born on May 3, 1901, in Mount Pleasant, Pennsylvania. He attended the Duquesne University Prep School, graduating in 1919. He entered the novitiate for the Holy Ghost Fathers the following year, and earned a bachelor's degree at Duquesne. He was ordained a priest for the Holy Ghost Fathers on August 29, 1925, after which he spent a year in New York City doing parish work and earning a doctorate at New York University. His brother was James P. Kirk, Treasurer of the City of Pittsburgh in the 1940s.

== Service to Duquesne University ==
Father Kirk returned to Duquesne University as a teacher in the Prep School in 1927. He quickly distinguished himself as a capable administrator, and was instrumental in preparing the university's School of Education for its state certification. He became the first dean of the Education School in 1929, and served in that position until his appointment as university president in February 1940.

On Kirk's appointment to the presidency of the university, the Pittsburgh Post-Gazette remarked that, at the age of 38, Kirk was "among the youngest university presidents in the nation". However, Kirk's six years as president were some of the darkest days of Duquesne University's history as enrollment shrank during the Second World War to nearly catastrophic levels.

In 1942, the administration of the university was seriously considering closing Duquesne. Seventy-one colleges around the country had already closed, but, Kirk had a connection that saved the university. His brother, Pittsburgh City Treasurer James P. Kirk, was able to use his political connections to arrange a contract with the Air Force, and Duquesne was selected as a training site for the first group of 350 Air Force officers and cadets. These students—937 men were provided with academic training at Duquesne from 1943 to 1944—were enough to keep Duquesne from closing its doors during the war years.

The enrollment drop made Kirk's job very difficult. The student body in 1940 was numbered at 3,100, and at its lowest during the summer of 1944, even with the Air Force cadets, enrollment dipped to no more than 1,000 students. Kirk was faced with a university debt of $450,000 from his predecessor, Father Jeremiah Callahan. A reorganization of the Law School caused dissent, resulting in the dismissal and resignation of several faculty members. The difficulties of leading the university through these struggles adversely affected Kirk's health, and he had to suspend his activities in 1945. He was relieved of the university presidency by Father Francis P. Smith in June 1946.

Father Kirk died on May 27, 1947, at the Holy Ghost Father's seminary in Ferndale, Connecticut, from a circulatory disease.

== Notes and references ==
Notes

Works cited

- "Father Kirk Appointed to Diocesan Board". Pittsburgh Post-Gazette. July 22, 1943. p. 18.
- "Rev. Callahan Quits as Head of Duquesne". Pittsburgh Post-Gazette. February 4, 1940. p. 6.
- Rishel, Joseph F.; Demilio, Paul (1997), "The Spirit That Gives Life": The History of Duquesne University, 1878-1996, Pittsburgh, Pennsylvania: Duquesne University Press, ISBN 0-8207-0268-4
- Snyder, James L. (December 1952). "Duquesne University, 1878–1953". Catholic Educational Review. Vol. 50. pp. 649–665.
- "University Plans Tribute to Father Kirk". Pittsburgh Post-Gazette. May 29, 1947. p. 7.

Catholic Church titles
| Preceded by Rev. Jeremiah J. Callahan | President of Duquesne University; 1940–1946 | Succeeded by Rev. Francis P. Smith |
