= Donald S. Nesti =

American Catholic priest and university president

Rev. Donald S. Nesti, C.S.Sp.

Tenth President of Duquesne University of the Holy Ghost
- In office 1980–1988
- Preceded by: Rev. Henry J. McAnulty
- Succeeded by: Dr. John E. Murray, Jr.

Personal details
- Born: 1936 (age 89–90) Monessen, Pennsylvania
- Education: St. Mary Seminary (B.A., 1959; B.D., 1964); Pontifical Gregorian University (S.T.L., 1966; S.T.D, 1970); University of Pittsburgh (M.A., 1976)

Donald Silvio Nesti, C.S.Sp. (born 1936) is an American Catholic priest in the Congregation of the Holy Spirit. He served as the tenth president of Duquesne University in Pittsburgh, Pennsylvania, from 1980 until 1988. He is the founder and current director of the Center for Faith and Culture at the University of Saint Thomas in Houston, Texas, and a professor of theology at St. Mary's Seminary, also in Houston.

== Background ==
Donald Nesti was born in Monessen, Pennsylvania and raised in Clairton. He attended Pennsylvania State University for a year before entering the Holy Ghost Fathers' St. Mary Seminary in Norwalk, Connecticut. Nesti earned a bachelor's degree in 1959, and was ordained on May 30, 1963. He continued his education at St. Mary's, receiving a Bachelor of Divinity degree in 1964. He also earned a Licentiate of Sacred Theology in 1966 and a Doctorate of Sacred Theology in 1970 from the Pontifical Gregorian University in Rome. In addition to his degrees in theology, he holds a master's degree in Italian from the University of Pittsburgh (1976), and did postdoctoral work at St. Edmund's College, Cambridge in 1972. He taught at Duquesne as a theology professor from 1970 to 1976, and has written two books and several articles on the relationship between the Catholic Church and the Religious Society of Friends (Quakers).

Nesti plays the French horn and speaks French, German, and Italian fluently.

== Service to Duquesne University ==
Nesti was the first Duquesne president selected by a search committee rather than appointed directly by the provincial of the Holy Ghost Fathers. At the time of his appointment, he was the director of planning, research, and renewal for the Eastern Province of the Holy Ghost Fathers and the director of the Immaculate Heart of Mary Seminary in Bethel Park.

The announcement of Nesti's selection was made on April 18, 1980, and he assumed office on the following July 1. His formal inauguration was held on October 3, 1980.

Nesti's administration at Duquesne met with controversy. He clashed with student groups on campus, including the Tamburitzans and the staff of the Duquesne Duke. While the Duke staff was chastised by the administration because of a "vulgar" and "tasteless" April Fools' Day edition of the paper, the Tamburitzans were angered at the cancellation of a 1987 world tour and investigation into their institutional practices by Academic Vice President Rolando Bonachea. Nesti also met with objections by the faculty senate on his handling of academic affairs, as well as resistance by students on campus policies. In light of these controversies, a vote of "no confidence" in the administration was issued by the Student Government Association on April 2, 1987.

The Nesti administration did, however, see many positive achievements, such as the construction of the A.J. Palumbo Center, which was begun in 1986 and completed in 1988. The university also made great progress in its academic quality, but persistent divisive issues in the university community forced Nesti's resignation on July 30, 1987. At the time, the Pittsburgh Post-Gazette opined that "Donald Nesti pursued a commendable goal—a renewed commitment to excellence and accountability—in a clumsy and insensitive manner". The university's Academic Vice President, Dr. Bonachea, served as acting president until the spring of 1988 and the selection of Dr. John E. Murray, Jr. as Duquesne's eleventh president. Dr. Bonachea had been a supporter of Nesti, and stated that despite the popular reaction against his administration, "Father Nesti was right. In my opinion, he is a man of truth and principle who was determined to protect the welfare of each student."

== Work at St. Thomas University ==
After departing from Duquesne, Nesti taught as a theology professor at the Pontifical College Josephinum in Columbus, Ohio from 1989 until 1993. In 1994 Nesti founded the Center for Faith and Culture at St. Thomas University in Houston, Texas, where he currently serves as director. The self-stated mission of the center is the study of the relation of the "Gospel vision to the American way of life". From 1995 until 2001, he also served as the Provincial Superior of the Western Province of the Holy Ghost Fathers.

== Notes and references ==
Works cited

- Donald S. Nesti, CSSp (curriculum vitae), University of St. Thomas, 2007, archived from the original on 2011-09-27
- Mannella, Susan (April 19, 1980), "Nesti Named Duquesne President", Pittsburgh Post-Gazette, p. 2
- Rishel, Joseph F.; Demilio, Paul (1997), "The Spirit That Gives Life": The History of Duquesne University, 1878–1996, Pittsburgh, Pennsylvania: Duquesne University Press, ISBN 0-8207-0268-4

Catholic Church titles
Preceded by Rev. Henry J. McAnulty	President of Duquesne University; 1980–1988	Succeeded by Dr. John E. Murray, Jr.
