= Association of the Holy Childhood =

Catholic children's organization

- Founded: 1843 (183 years ago)
- Founder: Bishop Charles de Forbin-Janson
- Type: Pontifical Mission Society
- Location(s): 70 West 36th Street, 8th Floor; New York, NY 10018
- Website: www.onefamilyinmission.org/hca.html

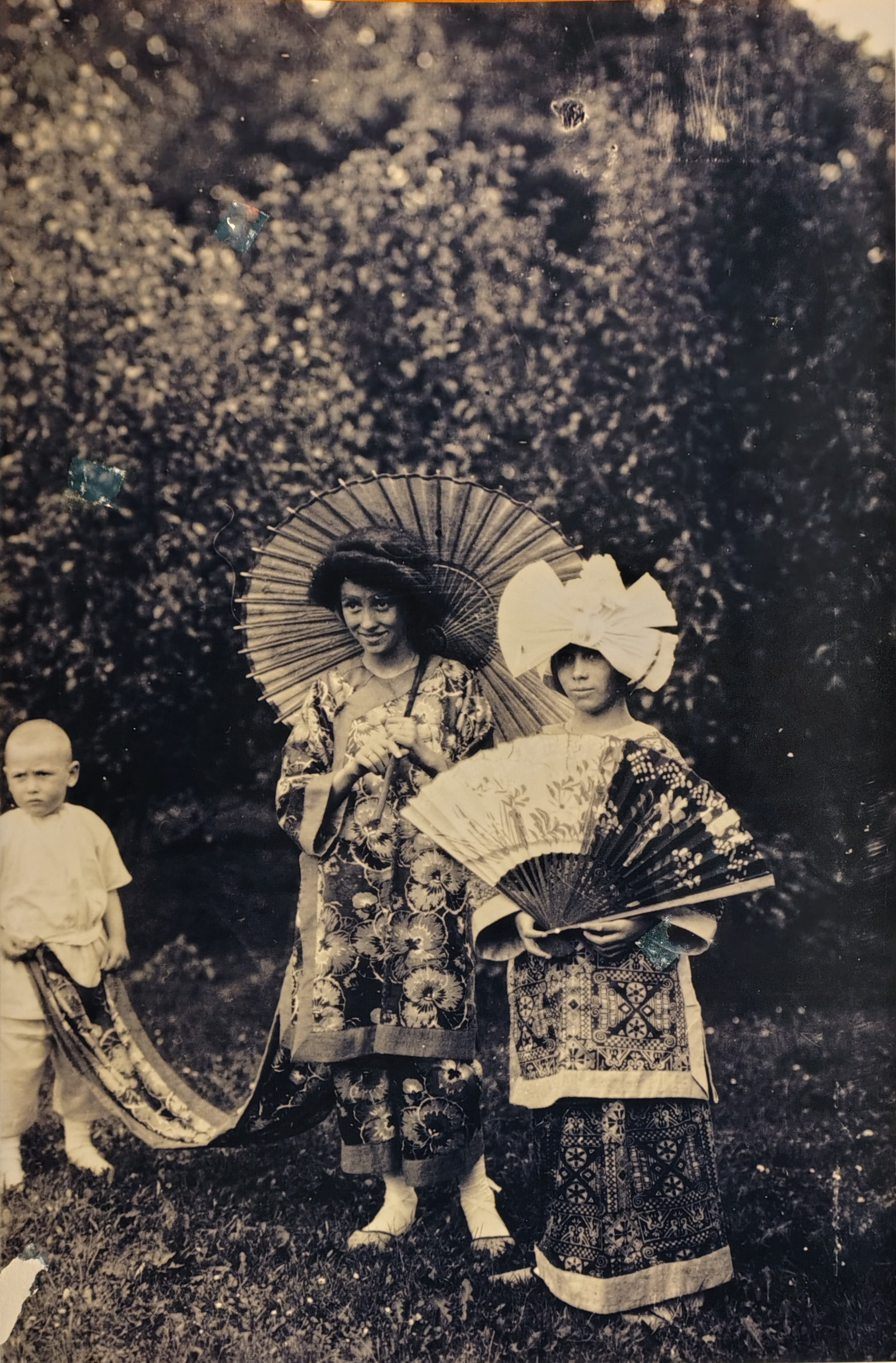
Children of the Association dressed as chinese, Netherlands, circa1930s

The Pontifical Association of the Holy Childhood (Latin: Pontificium Opus a Sancta Infantia) or Missionary Childhood Association, is a Catholic children's association for the benefit of foreign missions. It is one of four Pontifical Mission Societies and is dedicated to fostering children’s awareness of the missionary nature of the Church.

== Foundation ==
In 1843 Charles de Forbin-Janson, Bishop of Nancy, France, established the Association of the Holy Childhood (Association de la Sainte Enfance). Forbin-Janson sought a way to assist missionaries in China who had written for help. On the advice of Pauline Jaricot, who had founded the Society for the Propagation of the Faith some twenty years before, he established a children’s charity to provide assistance to children in foreign lands. Popes and other ecclesiastical dignitaries approved the association and recommended it to the Catholic faithful.

Pope Pius IX raised it to the rank of a canonical institution by a brief of 18 July 1856, gave it a Cardinal protector, and requested all bishops to introduce it in their dioceses. Pope Leo XIII, in the encyclical letter Sancta Dei civitas (3 December 1890), blessed it and recommended it again to the bishops.

The affairs of the association were managed by an international council at Paris, consisting of fifteen priests and as many laymen. This general council had an exclusive right of general direction and of the distribution of the society's funds.

French Catholic missionaries were active in China; they were funded by appeals in French churches for money. The Holy Childhood Association was a target of Chinese anti-Christian protests notably in the Tianjin Massacre of 1870. Rioting sparked by false rumors of the killing of babies led to the death of a French consul and provoked a diplomatic crisis.

== Later history ==
The association was probably established in the United States by Bishop Forbin-Janson himself. Several agencies in the East and West managed its affairs for about fifty years. On 1 January 1893, the work was concentrated into one central agency and confided to the Holy Ghost Fathers, with headquarters in Pittsburgh. Father Anthony J. Zielenbach, C.S.Sp., was its first central director for about four years; he was succeeded by Father John Willms, C.S.Sp. The Annals of the Holy Childhood was published bi-monthly and issued in a number of languages.

In 1922 the Association received the official title of “Pontifical” work, and the central administration was transferred to Rome. National offices exist now in more than 120 countries.

In the United States, membership is largely made up of students in Catholic elementary schools and religious education programs, and those homeschooled. In 2013 the Holy Childhood Association in the United States changed its name to the Missionary Childhood Association (MCA), although the previous name is still used is some dioceses for the time being. Many dioceses in the United States have an MCA office that works in cooperation with the diocesan mission office. The Association distributes educational and fund-raising programs to school and religious education programs. The proceeds support programs for underprivileged in Third World situations. The National office is in New York City.

== Mission Together ==
In England and Wales, Missio operates its children's branch as Mission Together, and has been active in Catholic schools for over a hundred and sixty years.

The organization encourages children worldwide to pray and share, while also supporting the spiritual and physical wellbeing of children through prayer and pastoral care, and tyheir understanding of Catholic Social Teaching. Through the financial contributions of children it carries out educational, medical and welfare projects in the poorest areas of the world.
