= Robert P. Imbelli =

American Catholic priest and theologian (born 1939)

Rev. Robert P. Imbelli (born January 8, 1939) is an American Catholic theologian and priest of the Archdiocese of New York. Imbelli is an associate professor emeritus of theology at Boston College in Chestnut Hill, Massachusetts, where he taught from 1986 to 2014. He was the director of the Institute of Religious Education and Pastoral Ministry at Boston College from 1986 to 1993. He previously taught theology at the New York Archdiocesan Seminary, St. Joseph's Seminary at Dunwoodie (1970–78) and at the Maryknoll School of Theology in Ossining, New York (1978–1986). While teaching in Boston, Imbelli served at Sacred Heart Church in Newton Centre.

== Early life and education ==
Imbelli was born on January 8, 1939, in New York City. He attended the Jesuit-run Regis High School on Manhattan's Upper East Side. He matriculated at Fordham University in the Bronx, New York, with a bachelor's degree in philosophy in 1960. After Fordham, Imbelli entered St. Joseph's Seminary, Dunwoodie, and was sent to study at the Gregorian University in Rome, Italy, where he earned a licentiate in systematic theology in 1966. While in Rome, Imbelli resided at the Almo Collegio Capranica. He was ordained a priest in Capranica's chapel on July 24, 1965. Imbelli's years of theological study in Rome coincided with the Second Vatican Council, which has profoundly shaped his theological thought and writing. Imbelli returned to New York after completing his degree at the Gregorian and, after a time serving as a parish priest, went to Yale University, where he completed his Ph.D. in systematic theology in 1972.

== Career ==
Following his graduation from Yale, Imbelli continued teaching at St. Joseph's Seminary where he had been a professor of systematic theology beginning in 1970. After leaving Dunwoodie in 1978, he taught at the Maryknoll School of Theology in Ossining, New York. In 1986, he accepted the position of director of the Institute of Religious Education and Pastoral Ministry at Boston College. In 1993, he stepped down as director and continued as an associate professor of theology until 2014. Imbelli was also an adjunct associate professor of theology in the Department of Religion and Religious Education at Fordham University (Summer 1977 and Summer 1981), a visiting lecturer in theology at Princeton Theological Seminary (Spring 1980) and scholar in residence at St. Joseph Seminary, Dunwoodie (1994–95). In recent years, he has taught as an adjunct professor at Dunwoodie. In addition to teaching, Imbelli has been a prolific contributor to journals and magazines, including Commonweal, America, L'Osservatore Romano, Theological Studies, The Thomist, Pro Ecclesia, Communio, Worship, Origins, The New Ressourcement, and Nova et Vetera. He edited and contributed to Handing on the Faith: the Church's Mission and Challenge, in 2006, and authored Rekindling the Christic Imagination: Theological Meditations for the New Evangelization in 2014. In 2018, Imbelli recorded a nine part lecture series, The Christic Imagination: How Christ Transforms Us, developing several themes from his book. In 2023, Word on Fire Academic published Christ Brings All Newness, a collection of Imbelli’s essays, reviews, and reflections. In addition to his frequent articles, he contributes regularly to Firstthings.com and Thecatholicthing.org.

== Awards and honors ==
In 2007 Imbelli's book Handing on the Faith: the Church's Mission and Challenge was chosen in third place for books in theology by the Catholic Press Association. He also received the Theron Rockwell Field Prize for his doctoral dissertation in 1973. His 2014 Rekindling the Christic Imagination received the First Place Award from the Association of Catholic Publishers in 2015.

A festschrift, The Center Is Jesus Christ Himself: Essays on Revelation, Salvation, and Evangelization in Honor of Robert P. Imbelli (Andrew Meszaros, ed.), was published by The Catholic University Press in spring 2021.

== Views on Christology ==
Imbelli's 2014 book, Rekindling the Christic Imagination: Theological Meditations for the New Evangelization (Liturgical Press), "seeks to meditate upon [the] Christic Center of Catholic faith as it expands from its Center in Christ into the intimately interrelated realities of Eucharist, church, and ultimately, Trinity". Rekindling "aspires to offer a 'mystagogical' meditation: one that evokes the mystery to which it inadequately points". To that end, each section of the book is accompanied by a work of art "internal to the book's purpose . . . of restoring the aesthetic to full citizenship in the theological enterprise". As the title suggests, the book aspires to contribute to the "New Evangelization" to which the post-conciliar popes have summoned the Church: "this evangelization is, at its heart, the call to renewed conversion to Jesus Christ and the passionate desire to share his Good News with others that they 'may have life and have it to the full' (John 10:10)."

== Issues facing the Church ==
Imbelli's book, Handing on the Faith: the Church's Mission and Challenge, is a collection of essays discussing the issues facing the Church. The different contributors' chapters address issues like religious education, community-based faith formation, identity and individualism, communication and future problems. Imbelli writes a thought provoking introduction to get the ball rolling on tackling these tough issues. Avery Dulles commented, "The Church is faced by no more serious problem than that of handing on the faith to the young. Recognizing current failures, Boston College recently assembled a distinguished group of Catholic scholars and educators, whose considered reflections are presented by the essays in this volume. The series closes with a summons to hope and courage evoking the spirit of Pope John Paul II. The authors seem to agree that teachers of Catholic doctrine can succeed if they are joyful witnesses to the Lord as he continues to dwell in the community of faith." He acknowledges the difficulties of passing on the faith to the next generation. His editing and collaboration with others starts an important discussion not only to bring to light these serious problems, but also to solve them.

== Bibliography ==
- "The Faith We Are Called to Keep … and to Spread", Voices of the Faithful, edited by William D’Antonio and Anthony Pogorelc (New York: Crossroad, 2007)
- "Word Incarnate", America, vol 197, no 7 (September 17, 2007)b
- "Avery Dulles: Vir Ecclesiasticus", foreword to Avery Cardinal Dulles, The McGinley Lectures (New York: Fordham University Press, 2008)
- "Dare a Cesare quell che è suo: Tra religione e politica", L'Osservatore Romano (August 11, 2008)
- "Incarnation and the Eucharist", Commonweal (April 10, 2009)
- "Paolo VI e Benedetto XVI: la matrice della dottrina sociale", L'Osservatore Romano (November 8, 2009)
- "Courageous Witness", Commonweal (March 12, 2010)
- "L'immagine indica la via della realtà", L'Osservatore Romano (April 21, 2010)
- "Newman e il Vaticano Secondo", L'Osservatore Romano (September 16, 2010
- "Refashioning Catholic Imagination", America, vol 203, no 7 (September 27, 2010)
- "Christ brings all Newness: the Irenaean Vision of Evangelii Gaudium", in PATH (Journal of the Pontifical Academy of Theology) vol 13: 2014
- "The Heart Has Its Reasons: Giving an Account of the Hope that Is in Us", in Handing on the Faith, ed Matthew Sutton and William Portier (Orbis Press: 2014)
- "The Identity and Ministry of the Priest in the Light of Vatican II: The Promise and Challenge of Presbyterorum Ordinis", in Josephinum Journal of Theology, 22, 1 (2015)
- Rekindling the Christic Imagination: Theological Meditations for the New Evangelization (Liturgical Press: 2014): First Place Award: Association of Catholic Publishers 2015
- "The Radical Newness of Jesus Christ in the Life and Ministry of the Diocesan Priest", in The Priest and Theological Study, ed. James Keating (IPF Publications: 2015)
- "Benedict and Francis", in Go Into the Streets: The Welcoming Church of Pope Francis, ed. Thomas Rausch and Richard Gaillardetz (Paulist Press: 2015)
- "The Christocentric Mystagogy of Benedict XVI", in Communio (Spring 2015)
- Handing on the Faith: the Church's Mission and Challenge, edited with "Introduction" (Crossroad 2017, 2nd printing)
- "Vatican II after Fifty-five Years" in America (October 16, 2017)
- The Christic Imagination: How Christ Transforms Us Lecture Series (Now You Know Media, 2018)
- "He Is Head of the Body, the Church: Salvation as Incorporation into Christ" in Communio (Summer 2019)
- "Sursum Corda: Ascension Theology and Spirituality" in Sola Gratia Sufficit: Festschrift for Cardinal Angelo Amato, ed. Manlio Sordi (Libreria Editrice Vaticana, 2019)
- "The Heart of the Matter: on Rowan Williams' Christ: the Heart of Creation" in America (April 1, 2019)
- "No Decapitated Body" in Nova et Vetera (Summer 2020)
- “Our True Identity: Tradition in Christian Mystical Theology, Commonweal (May 2022)
- “From Glory to Glory: Louis Bouyer’s Cosmic Vision, Commonweal (October 2023)
- “Christ Brings All Newness: Essays, Reviews, and Reflections by Robert P. Imbelli” (Word on Fire Academic, 2023)
- “Atonement as Doxological Communion: The Joy of the Feast,” in The Mystery of the Atonement, ed. Margaret Turek (Humanum Academic, 2025)
- “Soundings Towards a Eucharistic Christology,” The New Ressourcement (Fall 2025)

Poetry

- "Pro Horatio : on reading Odes : Book III". Commonweal. 150 (1): 31. January 2023.
