= Duquesne University School of Education =

Education school of Duquesne University

Coordinates: 40.436267°N 79.992324°W

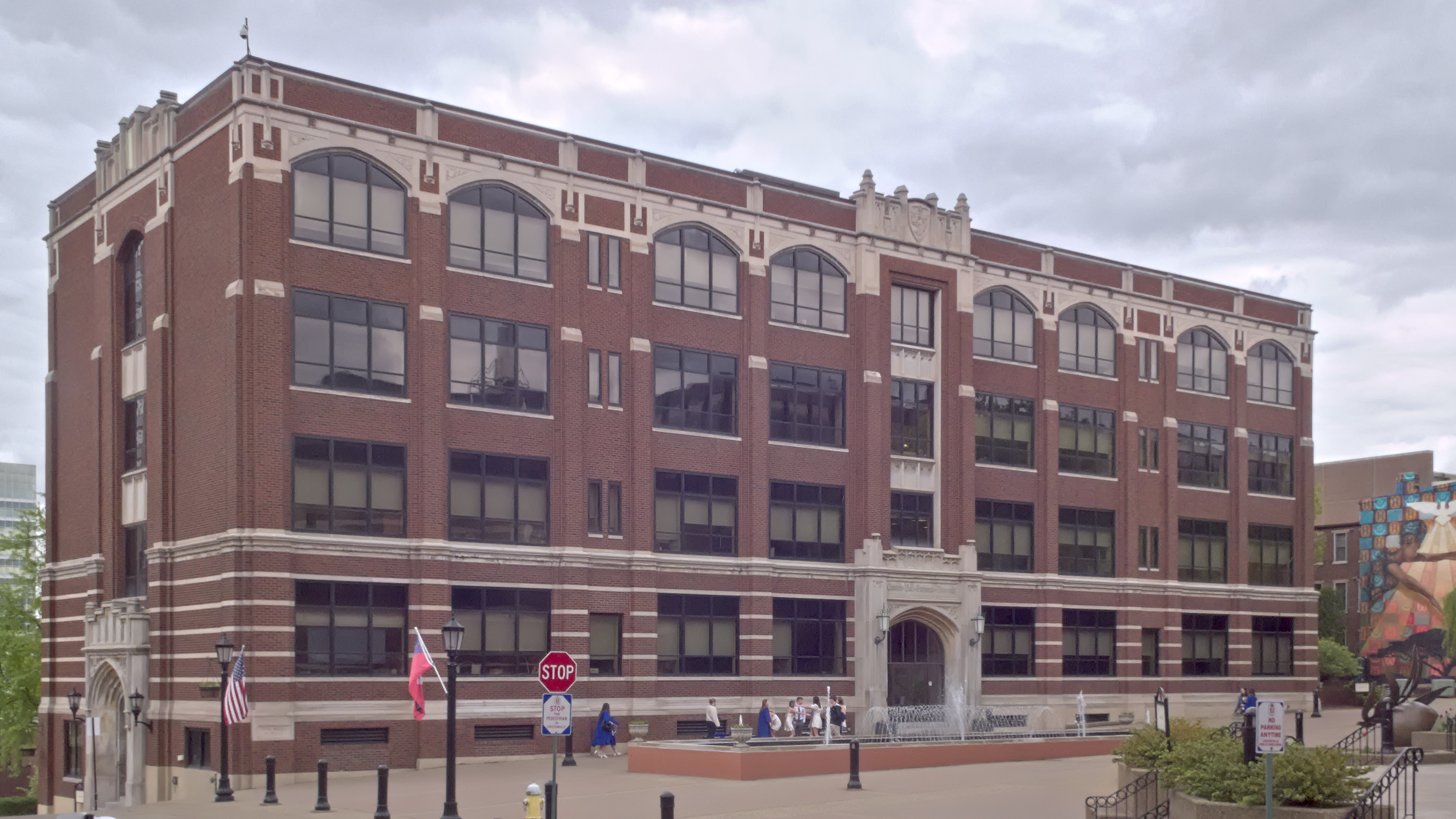
Canevin Hall, home of the School of Education

The Duquesne University School of Education is the school of education of Duquesne University in Pittsburgh, Pennsylvania. Founded in 1929, the school offers undergraduate teacher education programs and graduate programs in education, counseling, educational leadership and school psychology. The school is principally housed in Canevin Hall, a classroom building constructed in 1922.

== History ==
Teacher preparation at Duquesne initially took place within the College of Liberal Arts and Sciences. The School of Education was organized as a separate academic division in 1929 and awarded its first degree in secondary education that year. Raymond V. Kirk, a Spiritan priest who later served as president of Duquesne, organized the school and served as its first dean until 1940.

The school's programs subsequently expanded beyond secondary teacher preparation to include elementary and special education, counseling, educational administration, literacy education and school psychology. The school psychology program was established in 1969.

== Academics ==
At the undergraduate level, the school awards the Bachelor of Science in Education in early childhood education, middle-level education and secondary education. Students may also pursue dual certification in general and special education. Duquesne's educator-preparation programs are approved by the Pennsylvania Department of Education.

Graduate programs include Master of Arts in Teaching, Master of Science in Education and Master of Science degrees, as well as doctoral programs in educational leadership, counselor education and school psychology.

== Accreditation ==
The school's educator preparation programs are accredited by the Council for the Accreditation of Educator Preparation (CAEP). Duquesne received CAEP accreditation in 2020 following an external review.

Graduate programs in clinical mental health counseling, marriage, couple and family counseling, school counseling, and counselor education and supervision are accredited by the Council for Accreditation of Counseling and Related Educational Programs. The school's Ph.D. and Psy.D. programs in school psychology are approved by the National Association of School Psychologists and accredited by the American Psychological Association.

== Administration ==
Gretchen Givens Generett has served as dean since 2021, after serving as interim dean beginning in 2020. She was appointed to a second term in 2025.
