= David Granfield =

Roman Catholic priest and theologian

The Reverend David Granfield (April 11, 1922 – July 31, 2010) was a Roman Catholic priest in the Order of Saint Benedict, associated with Saint Anselm's Abbey in Washington, D.C., and a professor emeritus at The Catholic University of America's Columbus School of Law in Washington, D.C. He is most well known as a canon lawyer for his exposition of the Catholic Church’s view on abortion. His text on the inner experience of law continues to be a resource at many law schools.

Granfield graduated from the College of the Holy Cross with a B.A. in 1994. He then earned an LL.B. from Harvard Law School in 1947, and an M.A. in 1953 and S.T.D. in 1962 from the Catholic University of America. He was a professor at the Columbus School of Law from 1960 to 1995.

== Bibliography ==
=== Books ===
- Domestic Relations. New York: Foundation Press, 1963. (with Philip A. Ryan)
- The Abortion Decision. New York: Doubleday, 1969.
- The Inner Experience of Law: A Jurisprudence of Subjectivity. Washington, D.C.: Catholic University of America Press, 1988.
- Heightened Consciousness: The Mystical Difference. New York: Paulist Press, 1991. ISBN 0-8091-3174-9

=== Articles ===
"Jurors, Jury Charges and Insanity." Catholic University Law Review 14 (January 1965): 1 (with Richard Arens and Jackwell Susman)
