= John E. Murray Jr. =

American lawyer

11th President of Duquesne University
- In office May 1988 – May 2001
- Preceded by: Rev. Donald S. Nesti
- Succeeded by: Charles J. Dougherty

Chancellor of Duquesne University
- In office May 2001 – February 11, 2015

Personal details
- Born: John Edward Murray Jr. December 20, 1932 Philadelphia, Pennsylvania
- Died: February 11, 2015 (aged 82) Pittsburgh, Pennsylvania
- Education: La Salle University (1955); Catholic University of America (1958); University of Wisconsin–Madison (1959)

John Edward Murray Jr. (December 20, 1932 – February 11, 2015) was a chancellor and a professor of law at Duquesne University in Pittsburgh, Pennsylvania, United States. He was a former dean of the University of Pittsburgh School of Law and the Villanova University School of Law, as well as a former president of Duquesne University.

== Duquesne presidency ==
Murray was president of Duquesne University from 1988 to 2001, serving what the Pittsburgh Post-Gazette referred to as an "extraordinary tenure" that set "a standard of excellence and achievement that is truly remarkable and may prove hard to equal." During his administration, Duquesne grew from a small, financially distressed Catholic university to a major research institution with over 10,000 students, a significant endowment, and numerous new buildings and facilities.

== Scholarly career ==
Murray wrote a treatise on contracts and sales, Murray on Contracts (ISBN 0820551252), which is used by law students and practicing attorneys across America and has been cited in opinions by courts in numerous jurisdictions, including the United States Supreme Court. He also was the principal author of the supplements for the landmark multiple-volume treatise Corbin on Contracts (ISBN 0314284338). In addition, he wrote 19 books and numerous law-review articles on the law of contracts and sales. In 1992, he teamed with a former law student, Jon Hogue, to practice law and was a named principal and consulting partner in the Pittsburgh law firm of Murray, Hogue and Lannis. He was appointed in 2004 as a representative to the Oversight Authority for the City of Pittsburgh by Pennsylvania Governor Edward Rendell. Murray received the Distinguished Lifetime Service Award at the Eighth Annual International Conference on Contracts in Fort Worth in February, 2013.

== Personal life ==
A native of Philadelphia, Murray most recently lived in Pittsburgh, Pennsylvania. He died of a heart attack in February 2015, aged 82. He is survived by four children, six grandchildren, and his second wife, Marjorie Smuts.

Preceded by Rev. Donald S. Nesti	President of Duquesne University of the Holy Spirit; 1988–2001	Succeeded by Dr. Charles J. Dougherty
