= Michael Patella =

American monk and theologian (1954–2025)

Michael Patella, OSB (December 28, 1954 – July 15, 2025) was an American monk of Saint John's Abbey, author, theologian and professor of theology at Saint John's University in Minnesota, United States.

== Life and career ==
Patella was born in Rochester, New York, on December 28, 1954 along with his twin sister Francine. He studied at the Pontifical Biblical Institute, Rome and at the École Biblique.

Patella died in Collegeville, Minnesota, on July 15, 2025, at the age of 70. He had been struggling with ALS, having been diagnosed with the illness in January 2024.

== Sources ==
- St John's University

== Bibliography ==
- Patella, Michael The Death of Jesus 1999 ISBN 2-85021-113-3
- Patella, Michael The Gospel According to Luke 2005 ISBN 0-8146-2862-1
- Patella, Michael Lord of the Cosmos 2006 ISBN 0-567-02532-2
- Patella, Michael Angels and Demons: A Christian Primer of the Spiritual World 2012 ISBN 978-0-8146-3277-2
- Patella, Michael Word and Image: The Hermeneutics of The Saint John's Bible 2013 ISBN 978-0-8146-9196-0
