= McAnulty College and Graduate School of Liberal Arts =

Liberal arts college of Duquesne University

Coordinates: 40.43733°N 79.99151°W

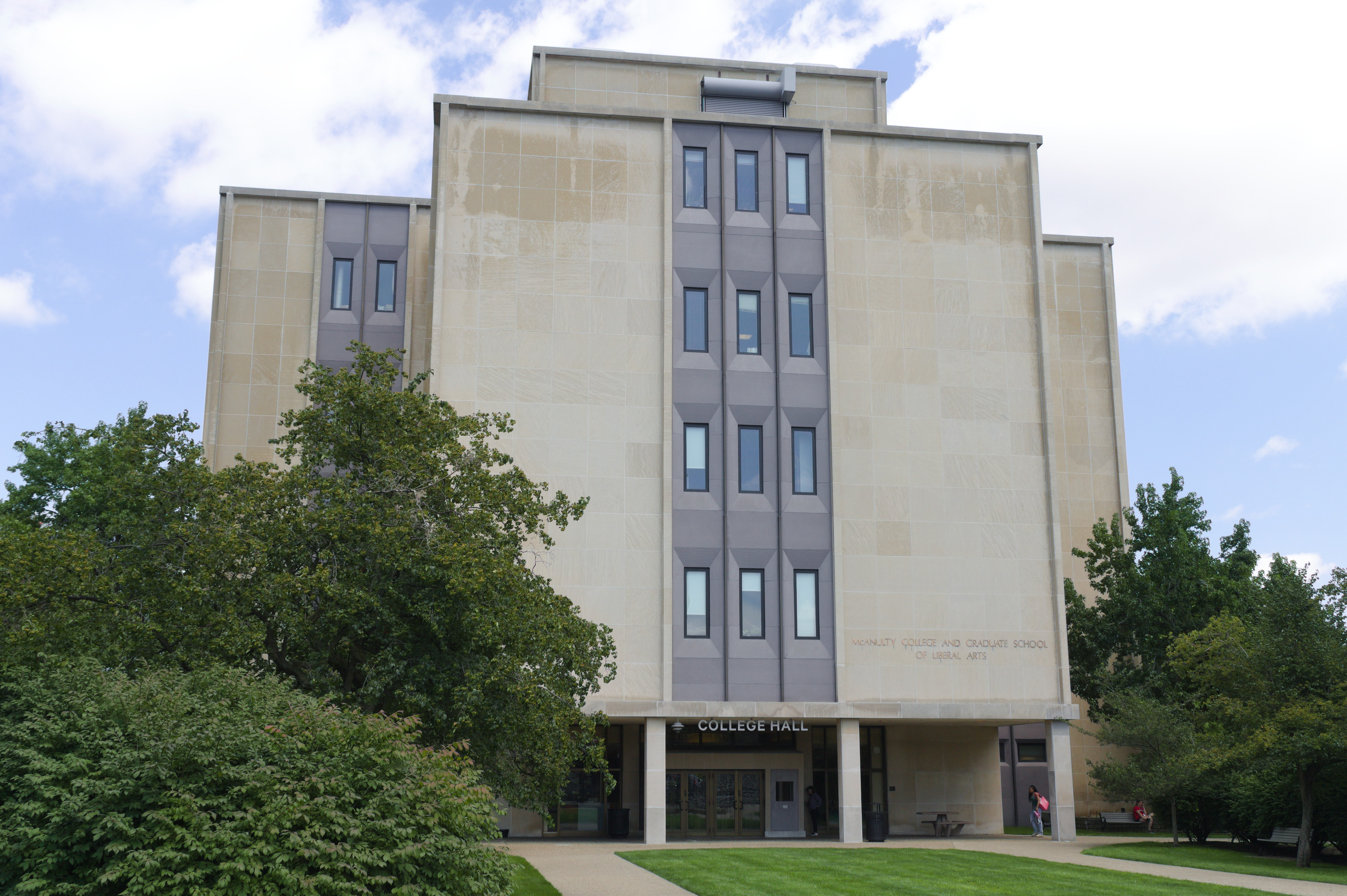
College Hall, home of the McAnulty College and Graduate School of Liberal Arts

The McAnulty College and Graduate School of Liberal Arts is the liberal arts college of Duquesne University in Pittsburgh, Pennsylvania. Established in 1878 as the College of Arts and Letters, it was the first of the university's academic schools. The college is based in College Hall, a six-story classroom and office building dedicated in 1970.

== History ==
The college traces its origins to the College of Arts and Letters established by the Fathers of the Congregation of the Holy Ghost in 1878. The institution was incorporated in 1882 as the Pittsburgh Catholic College of the Holy Ghost, with authority to grant degrees in the arts and sciences. In 1911, the College and University Council of Pennsylvania extended its charter to university status and approved the name Duquesne University.

The college later became known as the College and Graduate School of Liberal Arts and Sciences. In 1994, Duquesne reorganized that division, separating the departments of biological sciences, chemistry and biochemistry, and physics to form the School of Natural and Environmental Sciences, later the School of Science and Engineering. The reorganization left the College and Graduate School of Liberal Arts as a separate academic division.

In October 1995, the college and graduate school were dedicated in honor of Henry J. McAnulty, who had served as Duquesne's president from 1959 to 1980 and subsequently as university chancellor.

== Academics ==
The college offers undergraduate programs in the humanities, social sciences, communication and media, and interdisciplinary studies. All of its undergraduate majors lead to the Bachelor of Arts degree except the fully online organizational leadership program, which leads to a Bachelor of Science.

The graduate school encompasses nine departments and offers more than two dozen graduate degrees and certificates. Its programs include master's and doctoral study in fields including communication, English, history, healthcare ethics, philosophy, psychology, rhetoric, sociology and theology.

== Administration ==
Kristine L. Blair has served as dean since 2019. John C. Kern II is the associate dean.
