= Holy Ghost Preparatory School =

Location
- 2429 Bristol Pike; Bensalem, Bucks County, Pennsylvania 19020-5298; United States; 40°4′46″N 74°56′45″W

Information
- Former name: Holy Ghost Apostolic College
- Type: Catholic college-preparatory high school
- Motto: Latin: Cor unum et anima una (One heart and one mind)
- Religious affiliation: Catholic Church
- Denomination: Congregation of the Holy Spirit
- Established: 1897
- Founder: John Tuohill Murphy
- Status: Currently operational
- Sister school: Nazareth Academy High School
- CEEB code: 390870
- NCES School ID: 01184776
- Principal: Kevin Burke
- Staff: 35.6 (on an FTE basis)
- Grades: 9–12
- Years offered: 4
- Gender: All-male
- Enrollment: 454 (2025–2026)
  - Grade 9: 106
  - Grade 10: 103
  - Grade 11: 125
  - Grade 12: 110
- Average class size: 15
- Student to teacher ratio: 12.5:1
- Language: American Sign Language (ASL), Latin, and Spanish
- Schedule type: Letter Days
- Hours in school day: 6.5
- Campus size: 50 acres (20 ha)
- Campus type: Suburban
- Colors: Red, Royal Blue, & White
- Song: “Free Bird”
- Athletics: Yes
- Athletics conference: APAC, PIAA, PCL
- Sports: Hockey, Basketball
- Mascot: Firebird
- Nickname: Firebirds
- Team name: Holy Ghost Prep Firebirds
- Rivals: Father Judge High School, Bensalem High School, LaSalle College High School
- Accreditation: MSA
- SAT average: 1280
- Publication: Embers
- Newspaper: The Flame
- Annual tuition: $28,200
- Alumni: Rand Geiger, Nolan Jones
- Website: www.holyghostprep.org

Holy Ghost Preparatory School (often shortened to Holy Ghost Prep, Ghost, or HGP) is a Catholic college-preparatory high school for young men in Bensalem, Pennsylvania, United States. Missionaries of the Congregation of the Holy Spirit founded the school in 1897.

== History ==
Father John Tuohill Murphy founded Holy Ghost Prep in 1897 as Holy Ghost Apostolic College, a preparatory school and junior college seminary for young men preparing to become members of the Congregation of the Holy Spirit. In the 1950s, the school began moving its college-level program to Duquesne University. It opened its doors to non-seminarians for the first time in 1959. In 1967, the school discontinued the seminary program. Holy Ghost Preparatory School was formed as a non-profit institution a year later. In the 1990s, the school began a long-range planning process that led to significant structural enhancements to the campus. Today, its enrollment consists entirely of non-resident, college-bound students.

In 2015, Gregory J. Geruson became the school's first lay president. The school's "Vision 2020" Strategic Plan has led to the construction of a new STEM Tower. Step One of the STEM Tower, the Brennan Innovation Center, opened in August 2017. The rest of the STEM Tower was completed in time for the 2018–19 school year. In early 2018, the school also opened the Holt Center, which includes a performing arts center, a multipurpose gymnasium, music instruction rooms, and training areas for baseball, track and field, golf, lacrosse, and rowing. The Holt Center serves Holy Ghost students and will be available to community groups.

== Admissions ==
Holy Ghost Prep consists of 444 students. Located near the I-95 corridor in metropolitan Philadelphia, the school attracts students from more than 100 feeder schools from Bucks County, other metropolitan Philadelphia counties, and New Jersey.

=== Demographics ===
Enrollment by Race/Ethnicity 2024–2025
White	Hispanic	Asian	Two or More Races	Black
391	28	51	19	2

== Curriculum ==
Graduation requires coursework in English, mathematics, social studies, science, foreign language, fine arts, and theology with many electives, including computer science, cinematography, and portfolio art. As a school for the college-bound, HGP offers an extensive honors and Advanced Placement program, preparing students to take AP tests for college credit in 23 areas of study prescribed by the College Board. AP Calculus AB teacher Jerry Colapinto was awarded the 2007 Siemens AP Teacher of the Year award for Pennsylvania.

Holy Ghost Prep has been recognized by the National Blue Ribbon Schools Program.

== Extracurricular activities ==
=== Athletics ===
Holy Ghost Prep has many interscholastic and intramural sports teams. Major sports include basketball, baseball, ultimate Frisbee, bowling, soccer, swimming, lacrosse, ice hockey, tennis, cross country, rowing golf, and track and field. Athletic facilities on campus include seven fields for various sports, a fieldhouse with an auditorium and gymnasium, an all-weather track, and a new facility, the Holt Center, which contains a performing arts theater, music studios, a gym, batting cages, and a room for the rowing team. Holy Ghost Prep is a member of the Bicentennial Athletic League. The Firebirds have a tradition of excellence in all sports. There have been seven Pennsylvania state champions in school history: the 1972 and 1974 basketball teams, the 1992 soccer team, and, most recently, the 2011 tennis team. In 2013 and 2014, the soccer team won the PIAA state championship. In 2015, the hockey team won its first state championship. Harold "Jr." McIlwain ('93) won the 400m in the 1992 PIAA state track championships and followed that with the 800m title in 1993. Holy Ghost Preparatory School also added a rowing team in fall 2015.

In the fall of 2020, Holy Ghost Prep left the Bicentennial Athletic League. It began competing as an independent program while maintaining its membership in the PIAA and District One.

In the winter of 2025, Holy Ghost Prep's Ice Hockey team won the Flyers Cup, advancing to the AAA state championship.

== Notable alumni ==
- Kevin Collins (1986), actor and voice-over artist, Law & Order, Munich
- Ryan Gunderson (2003), professional ice hockey player for Brynäs IF of the Swedish Hockey League
- Nolan Jones (2016), professional baseball player for Cleveland Guardians of Major League Baseball
- Frank Seravalli (2006), senior hockey reporter for Canadian network TSN
- Paul McCrane (1978), actor, 24, ER
- Timothy J. Savage (1964), U.S. federal judge
- Rand Geiger (2002), producer of Stranger Things
- Aiden Robbins, Texas Longhorns player and top baseball prospect for the 2026 Major League Baseball draft

== See also ==
- Holy Ghost Seminary
