= James Devlin (priest) =

James Joseph "Father Joe" Devlin, SJ (December 27, 1916 – February 25, 1998) was an American Catholic priest and one of three American Jesuits during the Vietnam War who went to Vietnam to aid refugees. He was important in securing the passage of several thousand Cambodian refugees to America.

Devlin was born in San Francisco, where his family lived at 431 Jersey Street. He later joined the Jesuits and became a missionary to Vietnam.

In April 1975, Devlin escaped before the fall of Saigon and was evacuated by helicopter to the USS Midway (CV-41).

He built an orphanage in Thailand which housed, fed, and schooled several hundred abandoned children.

After Devlin's death, his brother, Fr Raymond Ambrose Devlin, wrote his biography, which he entitled Cha.

Devlin died in 1998 in Los Gatos, California.
