= Duquesne University Press =

Scholarly publisher

- Parent company: Duquesne University
- Founded: 1927
- Country of origin: United States
- Headquarters location: Pittsburgh, Pennsylvania
- Distribution: University Press of New England
- Publication types: Books
- Official website: www.dupress.duq.edu

Duquesne University Press, founded in 1927, is a publisher that is part of Duquesne University, in Pittsburgh, Pennsylvania.

The Press is the scholarly publishing arm of Duquesne University, and publishes monographs and collections in the humanities and social sciences. In particular, the university press's editorial program includes the following specific fields: literature studies (Medieval and Renaissance), philosophy, psychology, religious studies and theology, spirituality, and creative nonfiction.

== See also ==
- List of English-language book publishing companies
- List of university presses
