= Scientastic! =

Family television show

Scientastic! is an elementary to middle school age family television show that explores science, health, and social issues through the eyes of today's youth. The show was created by John A. Pollock, Leo Eaton, and Mike Erskine-Kellie. The show's format blends live-action and animation and is a hybrid of mystery and reality genres, incorporating a fictional plot with interviews from actual doctors and scientists in and around Pittsburgh, Pennsylvania, where the show is filmed. To date, two episodes have been released. The episode “Are You Sleeping?” was the recipient of two Emmy Awards in 2015.

== Concept ==
The show's concept originated from Duquesne University biology professor John A. Pollock, with the goal of improving science literacy among school students ages 8 to 13 years old. Pollock partnered with television production company Planet Earth Television to create the pilot episode, "Sticks and Stones" (2010) and the subsequent episode “Are You Sleeping?” (2014). Both episodes were directed by Emmy award-winning producer and director Leo Eaton (Zoboomafoo) and written by Mike Erskine-Kellie.

The show's storyline follows the character of a young girl driven to explore topics in science out of an interest to learn and a desire to help others and the world around her. In the pilot episode, the character is a 12-year-old girl named “Leah” (played by actress Lili Reinhart), while in the following episode “Are You Sleeping?” she is a 14-year old named “Cassie” (played by actress Gabrielle Phillips). Her younger brother (played by actors Joseph Serafini and Justin Bees) joins along as Cassie researches and finds leads at her local library and then visits different museums, hospitals, and institutions to conduct interviews with real-life specialists. The episode is supplemented with 2-D and 3-D animations that render anatomy and biology, as well as short interstitial episodes of music and dance.

Production of “Sticks and Stones” and “Are You Sleeping?” involved the efforts of many groups and individuals, including the Regenerative Medicine Partnership in Education, where Pollock serves as Principal Investigator, and the Pittsburgh Creative and Performing Arts School (CAPA).

== Pilot ==
The Scientastic! pilot episode, "Sticks and Stones," focuses on the biology of bones, bone nutrition, bone healing, and the use of stem cells in bone repair. It follows the story of Leah (actress Lili Reinhart) and her best friend Habiba (actress Habiba Hopson) who breaks her arm during a soccer practice after being roughhoused by a group of bullies on the opposing team. To help Habiba regain the confidence she needs to continue playing soccer, she investigates what bones are and how they heal, visiting hospitals, museums, and research laboratories in Pittsburgh. Included are interviews with doctors, scientists, and researchers at UPMC Children's Hospital of Pittsburgh, the Carnegie Museum of Natural History, the National Aviary, and the McGowan Institute for Regenerative Medicine.

Leah's younger brother Axel (played by actor Joseph Serafini) films her investigations. At the end, Leah compiles Axel's footage and creates a webcast, which is featured on the show's website.

The pilot was released in May 2010, first airing September 2, 2010, on WQED-TV, Pittsburgh's PBS member station.

== Episode "Are You Sleeping?" ==
The Scientastic! episode “Are You Sleeping” explores issues surrounding lack of sleep, particularly its impact on the capacity to learn and make decisions. In the episode, the lead character Cassie fails a math test that she stayed up all night studying for, prompting her to embark on a quest to learn about the science of sleep in order to help her sleep-deprived family and classmates. She and her younger brother Dean track down and interview professionals from the Pittsburgh Zoo, Phipps Conservatory, Meadowcroft Rockshelter, and a sleep lab at the University of Pittsburgh Medical Center, among others. The episode touches on a long-running debate in the U.S. surrounding sleep deprivation and school start times, which was addressed in 2013 by U.S. Secretary of Education Arne Duncan. Duncan called for shifting to later start times for students, stating that doing so is not only common sense but is also backed by scientific research.

The hour-long episode was aired in April 2014 on WQED-TV and was distributed by American Public Television to more than 100 public television stations across the U.S.

== Awards and Funding ==
In 2015, Scientastic! “Are You Sleeping?” won two Mid-Atlantic Region Emmy Awards from the National Academy of Television Arts and Sciences for in the Children/Youth/Teen Program or Special and Music Composition/Arrangement categories.

Scientastic! received funding from UPMC Health Plan, National Center for Research Resources of the National Institutes of Health, US Department of Education, and The Pittsburgh Foundation.
