= Regenerative Medicine Partnership in Education =

The Partnership in Education (formerly the Regenerative Medicine Partnership in Education) is a non-profit multidisciplinary health literacy and informal science education project based at Duquesne University in Pittsburgh, Pennsylvania. The Partnership in Education produces planetarium shows and other multimedia that focus on topics in health and biology.

The organization is directed by founder and principal investigator John A. Pollock, Ph.D., Full Professor of Biological Science at Duquesne University. It is funded primarily by a five-year Science Education Partnership Award (SEPA) from the National Institute of General Medical Sciences, a component of the National Institutes of Health (NIH), awarded to Pollock through Duquesne University. The Partnership received supplemental funding from different sources since its establishment in 2005, including the NCRR and the United States Department of Education.

The project employs a creative team of artists, researchers and student interns, and collaborates with outside researchers, artists and other professionals from many Pittsburgh-based science initiatives, cultural institutions, hospitals, universities and public and private elementary and secondary schools.

== Background ==
Before creating the Partnership in Education, Pollock worked with the Pittsburgh Tissue Engineering Initiative (PTEI) on several planetarium shows while acting as a Research Fellow at the STUDIO for Creative Inquiry at Carnegie Mellon University, an interdisciplinary arts center that enables art-science collaboration. He was co-director and science adviser for the internationally distributed Gray Matters: The Brain Movie (2000) and science adviser for Journey into the Living Cell (1996), where he first collaborated with the films’ associate director and researcher Patricia Maurides, then also a Research Fellow at the STUDIO for Creative Inquiry and current Adjunct Assistant Professor of Art at Carnegie Mellon.

From 2000 to 2005, Pollock and his collaborators received a five-year SEPA grant of $1.62 million to create a new planetarium show about tissue engineering, Tissue Engineering for Life (2003), at the time the largest amount given by the NIH for informal science education. Acting as director, Pollock again partnered with PTEI and Maurides, as well as several new researchers and artists including animator Laura Gonzalez. Tissue Engineering for Life debuted in 2003 at the Kamin Science Center in Pittsburgh as the world’s first tissue engineering planetarium show. Pollock then continued collaboration with Maurides, Gonzalez and PTEI to create two additional planetarium shows, Regenerobot and the Robot Science Fair and Dr. Allevable's Unbelievable Laboratory - Bone and Heart under the 2000-2005 SEPA grant.

In 2006, Pollock received a second five-year SEPA grant in the amount of $1.3 million and created the Regenerative Medicine Partnership in Education hosted by Duquesne University. Projects from 2005 and onwards involved the continued collaboration with Gonzalez and Maurides, bringing in artists Robert Hoggard and Joana Ricou, and working with several individuals from Duquesne University, the Entertainment Technology Center at Carnegie Mellon University, the Kamin Science Center, and scientists, artists and physicians from other Pittsburgh institutions.

== Role ==
The Partnership in Education has produced animated planetarium shows and movies, a pilot for a television series, teaching materials, interactive software, video games, board games and educational murals and artwork. The movies and multimedia explore from fundamental to advanced biology of the heart, brain, spinal cord, bones, immune system and stem cells in relation to health, treatment of disease and injury and the future benefits of stem cell therapies.

In addition, the project’s participation in a year-long celebration of Charles Darwin’s 200th birthday in Pittsburgh (“Darwin 2009: A Pittsburgh Partnership”) led to the creation of materials, multimedia, installations and theatrical performance that focused on the principle of evolution and genetics.

Planetarium show, movies, games and installations produced by the Partnership in Education have been exhibited and displayed for the general public at the Kamin Science Center in Pittsburgh and science centers and institutions throughout the United States and world, as well as cultural institutions such as the Carnegie Museum of Natural History, Phipps Conservatory and Botanical Gardens, the National Aviary, the Pittsburgh Zoo and PPG Aquarium, the Children's Museum of Pittsburgh and the American Philosophical Society Museum. The pilot episode for a television series, Scientastic!, aired in September 2010 on Pittsburgh's local public broadcasting station WQED (TV).

All of the multimedia the Partnership in Education produces has been made available for use in the classroom in DVD and web formats with accompanying lesson plans and guides for teachers. Pittsburgh Public Schools adopted two of the Partnership's teaching tools into their 9th grade science curriculum in 2009, the Darwin Synthetic Interview software and 3-D models of horse feet that teach the horse's evolutionary history. Darwin Synthetic Interview software enables students to learn about the life of Charles Darwin and the principle of evolution using Synthetic Interview technology developed by the Entertainment Technology Center at Carnegie Mellon University.

The Partnership has participated in professional development workshops in the U.S., including an annual workshop at the University of Texas in Austin.

== Projects ==
Planetarium Shows and Movies

- Tissue Engineering for Life -2nd Edition (2003–2004)
- Regenerobot and the Robot Science Fair (2003–2004)
- Dr. Allevable’s Unbelievable Laboratory (2003–2004)
- Gray Matters: Brain Show (2007–2008)
- Osteoporosis and the Health of the Bone (2007–2008)
- Our Cells, Our Selves (2007)
- Scientastic! (2010)
- How We Grow (in production)

Games

- Immunologee
- Dr. Allevable’s Kiosk
- Poor Benny
- Darwin Synthetic Interview (2009)

Art

- The Spiral of Life Mural Series (2009)

Theater

- Bobby the Rat-Catcher (2009)

Events

- Darwin 2009: A Pittsburgh Partnership
- DNA Day 2009

== Collaboration ==
The Partnership in Education has collaborated with:

- Pittsburgh Tissue Engineering Initiative
- Bayer School of Natural and Environmental Sciences
- McAnulty College and Graduate School of Liberal Arts
- Entertainment Technology Center
- Carnegie Science Center
- Carnegie Museum of Natural History
- National Aviary
- Pittsburgh Zoo and PPG Aquarium
- Children's Museum of Pittsburgh
- Phipps Conservatory and Botanical Gardens
- Carnegie Library of Pittsburgh
- Planet Earth Television
- Pittsburgh Creative and Performing Arts School
- University of Pittsburgh Medical Center
- McGowan Institute for Regenerative Medicine

== Funding ==
The Partnership in Education has received funding from:

- National Center for Research Resources
- United States Department of Education
- Duquesne University
- John Templeton Foundation
- UPMC Health Plan
- The Pittsburgh Foundation
