= Center for American Indian and Rural Health Equity =

US research center

Center for American Indian and Rural Health Equity (CAIRHE)
- Parent institution: Montana State University
- Established: September 15, 2014
- Mission: To reduce significant health disparities in Native and rural communities through community-based participatory research (CBPR) that is considerate of and consistent with their cultural beliefs.
- Address: 2155 Analysis Dr.
- Location: Bozeman, Montana
- Coordinates: 45°40′08″N 111°03′59″W
- Interactive map of Center for American Indian and Rural Health Equity (CAIRHE)
- Website: https://www.montana.edu/cairhe/

The Center for American Indian and Rural Health Equity (CAIRHE) is an official state of Montana research center based at Montana State University (MSU) in Bozeman, Montana. Founded in 2014, CAIRHE conducts research on topics including mental health, workplace trauma and occupational health, health care access, maternal health, sleep health, sexual and reproductive health, nutrition and food security, addiction and resilience, environmental health, oral health, and COVID-19.

== History ==
CAIRHE was founded on September 15, 2014. The center was originally known as the Center for Health Equity in Rural Montana but was renamed the Center for American Indian and Rural Health Equity in January 2016. Allen Harmsen was the founding principal investigator from 2014 through 2015. In January 2016, Alexandra Adams became the director and principal investigator of CAIRHE. The center was established with a Centers of Biomedical Research Excellence (COBRE) grant from the National Institute of General Medical Sciences of the National Institutes of Health. In September 2016, CAIRHE was named a Montana research center by the Montana University System Board of Regents.

In 2020, the center received a grant of $1.8 million from the Rapid Acceleration of Diagnostics initiative (RADx) of the NIH. The award was one of only 70 RADx-UP grants issued and the only program in Montana to obtain this funding.

== Programs ==
The center provides assistance with mentoring, professional development, and funding for research and pilot projects. These projects are designed to increase grant support success rates from major grant-funding agencies like the National Institutes of Health (NIH), the National Science Foundation, and the U.S. Department of Agriculture. CAIRHE also supports its faculty and other researchers through two research cores: the Montana IDeA Community Engagement Core and the Translational Biomarkers Core.

CAIRHE is among a number of programs that address the health disparities of American Indian and Alaska Native people and their historical under-representation in biomedical science, both as professionals and as participants in research studies. As such, CAIRHE has supported a variety of research projects supporting the center's health equity mission, led by faculty from Montana State University. CAIRHE investigators specialize in multiple disciplines, including psychology, sociology and anthropology, health and human development, education, mechanical and industrial engineering, and land resources and environmental sciences. Interdisciplinary study also exists with the Mark and Robyn Jones College of Nursing and the Jake Jabs College of Business & Entrepreneurship.

== Projects and studies ==
=== Research projects ===
Past and present research projects have included:

- A Trauma-Informed Intervention for Positive Youth Development and Teacher Wellness in Rural Montana
- A Native Path to Courage
- Assessing Sleep in Blackfeet Families with K-3rd Grade Children
- Modeling Rural Perinatal Health Outcomes and Service Systems to Improve Health Equity
- Development and Pilot Test of Indigenist Relapse Prevention for American Indians
- The UnProcessed Pantry Project (UP3): A Novel Approach to Improving Dietary Quality for Low-Income Adults Served by Rural Food Pantries
- Somatic Mindfulness Training for a Healthy Workforce
- The Fort Peck Sexual Health Project
- Increasing Environmental Health Literacy in a Native American Community (or "Guardians of the Living Water")
- Increasing Access to Oral Health Care: Evaluating the Outcomes of a Community Health Specialist Program

=== Pilot projects ===
In addition to CAIRHE's work on a range of research projects, the center has also supported a range of smaller pilot projects that help investigators collect preliminary data and prepare larger grant proposals for the years ahead. Pilot projects receive support for a maximum of two years.

Since 2014, CAIRHE pilot projects have examined a wide range of health and equity research topics that have included:

- Rural reproductive healthcare
- Attitudes and behaviors surrounding traditional foods
- Mental health support
- Sleep health disparities and socioecological risk factors
- Osteoarthritis in agricultural workers
- Cognitive Behavior Therapy implementation in schools
- Impacts of SARS-CoV-2 on age-related inflammation
- Trauma, daily stress, sleep, and blood pressure in American Indian adults
- Secondary trauma among victim service providers
- Rural health center efficiency, access, and outcomes
- Substance use and driving among rural young adults
- Maternal mental health
- Prisoner reentry and recidivism in Montana

=== 2021 "Protecting Our Community" Study ===
In 2020 the center was awarded a $1.8 million two-year grant from the NIH to research COVID-19 testing strategies in under-served populations in Montana and Washington. The grant was part of the NIH's $1.4 billion Rapid Acceleration of Diagnostics (RADx) initiative, which was created in the first weeks of the COVID-19 pandemic to address testing disparities in the United States. A component targeting underserved populations known as RADx-UP funded community-engaged projects, including CAIRHE's, that worked alongside communities threatened most by the pandemic.

The study, "Protecting Our Community: A Pragmatic Randomized Trial of Home-Based COVID-19 Testing with Native American and Latino Communities," was led by CAIRHE and principal investigator Alexandra Adams. Partners in the study included the University of Washington’s School of Medicine and Institute of Translational Health Sciences; the Fred Hutchinson Cancer Research Center in Seattle; and Salish Kootenai College and the Confederated Salish and Kootenai Tribes on the Flathead Reservation in Montana.

=== Promoting Indigenous Research Leadership (PIRL) ===
Since 2019, CAIRHE has sponsored Promoting Indigenous Research Leadership (PIRL), an annual three-day workshop that supports the public health research careers of Indigenous and other early-career faculty who work with Indigenous communities. The workshop hosts faculty investigators from across the United States for enriching career development presentations and intensive mentoring. The 2019 and 2021 workshops were held in Bozeman, Montana, and the 2022 event was held in Grand Forks, North Dakota, in partnership with the Indigenous Trauma and Resilience Research Center at the University of North Dakota School of Medicine and Health Sciences. The 2023 workshop was held in Tempe, Arizona, in collaboration with partners at Arizona State University.

== Cores ==
CAIRHE's core facilities provide researchers with access to advanced technology and instrumentation, as well as training and assistance in community-engaged research.

=== Translational Biomarkers Core ===
The Translational Biomarkers Core allows researchers to assess relevant biomarkers associated with public and rural health research. Biomarkers assessed include: inflammation, oxidative stress, psychological stress, hormones, metabolic disease, and nutrition analytes. The laboratory is located on the MSU campus in Bozeman and provides faculty with access to research facilities, instrumentation, biomarker analysis, expert consultation, and relevant training.

The Translational Biomarkers Core Laboratory has a variety of advanced instrumentation that greatly enhances CAIRHE's research and allows investigators at MSU and throughout the Mountain West region to conduct extensive public health studies. Translational Biomarkers Core instrumentation includes:

- Bio-Rad Bio-Plex 200 System
- Eppendorf MasterCycler Nexus Gradient ThermoCycler
- Beckman Coulter CytoFLEX Flow Cytometer
- SpectraMax iD3 Multi-Mode Microplate Reader
- Applied Biosystems QuantStudio 5 Real-Time PCR System
- Labconco FreeZone 2.5 Liter BenchTop Freeze Dry System
- Fisherbrand IsoTemp UltraLow Temperature Freezer
- Tecan HydroFlex Plate Washer
- Buchi Evaporation System
- Miltenyi QuadroMacs Separator and MultiStand, gentleMACS Dissociator
- ESCO CelCulture CO_{2} Incubator
- OrganoMotion N-Evap 11155 (12-position)
- Eppendorf 5424 R Microcentrifuge
- Fisher 850 Homogenizer
- Eppendorf Centrifuge 5810R
- Bio-Rad Trans-Blot Turbo Transfer System
- Bio-Rad Criterion Cell
- Fisherbrand Iso Temp Oven

=== Montana IDeA Community Engagement Core ===
CAIRHE's Montana IDeA Community Engagement Core aids faculty in building community-investigator partnerships across the state of Montana. The core also provides effective training to the center's investigators and other faculty at the university. CAIRHE shares operation of the core with the Montana INBRE program at MSU. Both CAIRHE and Montana INBRE are supported by the Institutional Development Award (IDeA) initiative at the NIH’s National Institute of General Medical Sciences.

Similar to many of CAIRHE's other initiatives, the core follows a community-based participatory research (CBPR) framework. Team members of the core work alongside public health professionals, medical professionals, epidemiologists, lab scientists, community and tribal leaders, information systems experts, social scientists, behavioral health professionals, engineers, and others to help investigators address health disparities through community engagement.
