= Antioxidants & Redox Signaling =

American academic journal

- Language: English
- Edited by: Chandan K. Sen

Publication details
- History: 2001-present
- Publisher: Mary Ann Liebert, Inc. (United States)
- Frequency: 36/year
- Impact factor: 6.323 (2019)

Standard abbreviations
- ISO 4: Antioxid. Redox Signal.

Indexing
- ISSN: 1523-0864 (print); 1557-7716 (web)

Links
- Journal homepage; Online Access

Antioxidants & Redox Signaling is a peer-reviewed scientific journal covering reduction–oxidation (redox) signaling and antioxidant research. It covers topics such as reactive oxygen species/reactive nitrogen species (ROS/RNS) as messengers gaseous signal transducers, hypoxia and tissue oxygenation, microRNA, prokaryotic systems, and lessons from plant biology.

== Abstracting and indexing ==
This journal is indexed by the following services:

- Biological Abstracts
- Biochemistry & Biophysics Citation Index
- BIOSIS Previews
- Chemical Abstracts
- Current Contents/Life Sciences
- EMBASE/Excerpta Medica
- EMBiology
- Journal Citation Reports/Science Edition
- MEDLINE
- Science Citation Index
- Scopus

According to Journal Citation Reports, the journal has a 2014 impact factor of 7.407.
