= John A. Pollock (professor) =

- Citizenship: United States
- Education: Syracuse University (B.S., M.S., Ph.D.)
- Awards: AAAS Fellow Presidential Award for Excellence in Science, Mathematics and Engineering Mentoring Apple Award for Distinguished Educator Emmy Award for Children/Youth/Teen Program or Special Emmy Award for Musical Composition/Arrangement Parents' Choice Award Carnegie Science Award
- Scientific career
- Fields: Molecular neurobiology, Science and health literacy education
- Workplaces: Duquesne University
- Doctoral advisor: Edward Lipson, Seymour Benzer

John A. Pollock, is a Full Professor of Biological Science at Duquesne University Bayer School of Natural and Environmental Sciences, where he researches and teaches molecular neurobiology. He is Principal Investigator for The Partnership in Education, a non-profit multidisciplinary health literacy and informal science education project at Duquesne University funded primarily through a Science Education Partnership Award(SEPA) from the National Institute of General Medical Sciences, a component of the National Institutes of Health.

Pollock holds the additional title of co-director for the Chronic Pain Research Consortium at Duquesne University. He serves as a faculty affiliate at the BrainHub at Carnegie Mellon University and separately at the McGowan Institute for Regenerative Medicine, University of Pittsburgh/UPMC.

== Education ==
After receiving a B.S. and M.S. in physics from Syracuse University, Pollock earned his Ph.D. in biophysics in 1984 under the guidance of Dr. Edward Lipson. He did his post doctoral training at the California Institute of Technology with Seymour Benzer, where he studied the molecular neurogenetics of the developing eye and brain.

== Scientific career ==
Pollock worked at Carnegie Mellon University as an assistant and associate professor of biology and director of biological sciences graduate programs. In 2001 he became an associate professor of biology and then full professor at Duquesne University, where he continues his research in molecular neurobiology and serves as director of the graduate program.

Pollock's research in neurobiology focused on the development of nerve cells in the fruit fly Drosophila. His early work explored the cell specific expression of genes such as sevenless, the opsins and arrestins. He also helped to develop techniques for the subcellular localization of mRNAs by high voltage electron microscopy. His research has more recently identified that the RUNX1 transcription factor, Lozenge, initially influences cells with undetermined fates to choose survival over death, while Lozenge proteins contribute to how a cell chooses a specific fate. Following his independent cloning of TRP in the 1980s, Pollock has re-focused his research on TRP related proteins that are involved in pain sensation in the peripheral nervous system.

Pollock also collaborates with Jelena Janjic, Ph.D. of the School of Pharmacy of the Rangos School of Health Sciences at Duquesne University analyzing the involvement of neuroinflammation in the changes in TRPV1 expression and the attenuation of inflammation with nano-emulsion delivered drug therapy. In addition to neurobiology, Pollock has taught such subjects as developmental biology, light microscopy, physics, calculus, astronomy and ethics.

== Informal science education ==
=== The Partnership in Education ===
As director and executive producer of The Partnership in Education, Pollock specializes in creating planetarium shows and interactive multimedia that visualize topics in health and biology. Several past productions have focused on the potential for stem cell and tissue engineering research to help patients with bone, heart and spinal cord trauma and disease, as well as autoimmune diseases like Type I Diabetes.

Pollock initially became interested in animation as a way to simplify and communicate important topics in science while a graduate student at Syracuse University, where he was the only science major in his animation class. As a research fellow at the STUDIO for Creative Inquiry at Carnegie Mellon, an interdisciplinary arts center that enables art-science collaboration, he began collaborating with colleague Patricia Maurides and the Pittsburgh Tissue Engineering Initiative (PTEI) in 1996. He acted as science adviser to Journey into the Living Cell (1996) and co-director and science adviser for the internationally distributed Gray Matters: The Brain Movie (2000).

Building on these initial successes, in 2000 Pollock (as co-PI) and his collaborators at the STUDIO for Creative Inquiry and PTEI received a $1.62 million five-year Science Education Partnership Award (SEPA) from the National Center for Research Resources. In 2001, at Duquesne University, Pollock founded The Partnership in Education focused on developing digital media for informal STEM education. Pollock received a second SEPA in 2006 and then a third SEPA in 2014 from the National Institute of General Medical Sciences (NIGMS).

=== Planetarium shows ===
Since 2000, Pollock has directed and produced several health literacy planetarium shows, including Tissue Engineering for Life, Regenerobot and the Robot Science Fair, Dr. Allevable's Unbelievable Laboratory – Bone and Heart, Our Cells, Our Selves, and How We Grow. Many have been shown at the Carnegie Science Center Buhl Planetarium, and have been distributed to science centers and educators worldwide.

Partnering with the Entertainment Technology Center (ETC), Pollock led the production of several video games that expand upon lessons in the films. He received national recognition at the 2010 Games for Health conference.

=== Charles Darwin Synthetic Interview ===
Upon receiving the 2008 Darwin Evolution/Revolution Award from the NIH, Pollock and his team marked the bicentennial of the birth of Charles Darwin with a year-long celebration titled "Darwin 2009: A Pittsburgh Partnership". The life and intellectual impact of Darwin was celebrated in Pittsburgh, Pennsylvania, with a citywide series of events for children, teachers, students, and the general public. Unique aspects of Darwin's accomplishments were highlighted using the distinct abilities and resources of six major cultural institutions throughout Pittsburgh.

The key event was the Charles Darwin Synthetic Interview, an interactive display created in partnership with the ETC that allows visitors to ask 199 questions to a virtual re-creation of Darwin. The exhibit is installed as a permanent installation at the Carnegie Science Center in Pittsburgh, and the software has been used as part of the science curriculum of Pittsburgh Public Schools. In 2015, Pollock released the Charles Darwin Synthetic Interview mobile app for iOS and Android devices, an adaptation of the original software. The app received a Parents' Choice Award in 2016.

=== Scientastic! ===
Other projects led by Pollock include Scientastic!, a combination live-action and animated television show of two episodes for pre-teens and teens that explores topics in health and science, as well as social issues.

The second episode titled "Are You Sleeping?" explored the science of sleep and was distributed to public television stations throughout the United States by American Public Television. It aired in April 2014 and was made available for digital download. In 2015, the episode won two Emmy Awards from the National Academy of Television Arts and Sciences (Mid-Atlantic Chapter); the Emmy Award for Children/Youth/Teen Program or Special and the Emmy Award for Musical Composition/Arrangement.

The pilot episode titled "Sticks and Stones" debuted on WQED, Pittsburgh's local PBS station, in September 2010 and focused on broken bones and bone regeneration. It starred Riverdale actress Lili Reinhart as the show's main character.

=== Mobile apps ===
In addition to the Charles Darwin Synthetic Interview app, Pollock has led the development of several mobile apps through The Partnership in Education. Powers of Minus Ten – Bone, a companion app to Scientastic! "Sticks and Stones" about bone biology, received recognition by Apple in the 2011 App Store Rewind and has been downloaded over 600,000 times.

Pollock later developed a mobile app series titled BiblioTech, which uses an interactive narrative platform. BiblioTech "CityHacks: In Search of Sleep", a companion app to Scientastic! "In Search of Sleep," further explores stories on the need for sleep. In 2016, the app received a Parents' Choice Award and a bronze honor at the international 2016 Serious Play Conference. Subsequently, an app on sports-related concussion titled BiblioTech "Rebound: Beating Concussions" won a Parents' Choice Award in 2018. The app uses "Adaptive Reader" software, which allows readers to switch the reading level of the text.

== Awards ==
In 2018, Pollock was named a Fellow of the American Association for the Advancement of Science (AAAS), the world's largest scientific society. Pollock is a recipient of the 2018 Presidential Award for Excellence in Science, Mathematics and Engineering Mentoring, the highest national mentoring award bestowed by the White House, which recognizes those who have "demonstrated excellence in mentoring individuals from groups that are underrepresented in STEM education and workforce." Pollock also received the 2011 Carnegie Science Award honoring his efforts in informal science education and was named an Apple Distinguished Educator in 2017. He has been a featured speaker at a TEDxYouth conference in 2016 and engages in community service by volunteering as a reading tutor, among other activities.

=== Selected awards ===
- 2018 Fellow of the American Association for the Advancement of Science (AAAS)
- 2018 Presidential Award for Excellence in Science, Mathematics and Engineering Mentoring
- 2018 Duquesne University President's Award for Faculty Excellence in Service to the Mission
- 2018 Parents' Choice 'Recommended' Award for Mobile App for "Rebound: Beating Concussions"
- 2017 Apple Distinguished Educator
- 2016 International Serious Play Competition Bronze Honors
- 2016 Create Pittsburgh Top 10 Education and Gaming Projects of the Year
- 2016 Parents' Choice 'Recommended' Award for Mobile App for "CityHacks: In Search of Sleep"
- 2016 Parents' Choice 'Recommended' Award for Mobile App for "Charles Darwin Synthetic Interview"
- 2015 Emmy Award for Children/Youth/Teen Program
- 2015 Emmy Award for Musical Composition/Arrangement
- 2013 Duquesne University President's Award for Excellence in Teaching
- 2013 Apple App Store Rewind 'New & Noteworthy' for Powers of Minus Ten – Bone
- 2011 Carnegie Science Award, Special Recognition in Science Education

== Funding ==
- Science Education Partnership Award (NIH)
- Darwin Evolution/Revolution Award (NIH)
- U.S. Department of Education
- The Pittsburgh Foundation
- John Templeton Foundation
- UPMC Health Plan
- Hillman Family Foundations

== Selected publications ==
1. B. Kantorski, C. W. Sanford-Dolly, D. R. Commisso, J. A. Pollock (2019). Backward design as a mobile application development strategy. Educational Technology Research and Development, 67(3), 711–731.
2. M. Saleem, A. Stevens, B. Deal, L. Liu, J. M. Janjic, J. A. Pollock (2019). New Best Practice for Validating Tail Vein Injections in Rat with Near-infrared-Labeled Agents. J. Vis. Exp. (146), e59295, doi:10.3791/59295.
3. M. Janjic, K. Vasudeva, M. Saleem, A. Stevens, L. Liu, S. Patel, J. A. Pollock (2018). Low-dose NSAIDs reduce pain via targeted nanoemulsion delivery to neuroinflammation in rat. Journal of Neuroimmunology, 318, 72–79.
4. D. J. Lampe, B. Kantorski, J. A. Pollock (2018) Charles Darwin Synthetic Interview: A 19th century scientist speaks in the 21st century. Journal of STEM Outreach, 1(1).
5. B. Kolber, J. Janjic, J. A. Pollock, K Tidgewell (2016). Summer undergraduate research: A new pipeline for pain clinical practice and research. BMC Medical Education,16(1),135.
6. K. Vasudeva, Y. Vodovotz, N. Azhar, D. Barclay, J. M. Janjic, J. A. Pollock (2015). In vivo and systems biology studies implicate IL-18 as a central mediator in chronic pain. Journal of Neuroimmunology, 283, 3-49.
7. K. Vasudeva, K. Andersen, B. Zeyzus-Johns, S. K. Patel, T. K. Hitchens, J. M. Janjic, J. A. Pollock (2014). Imaging neuroinflammation in vivo in a neuropathic pain rat model with near-infrared fluorescence and ^{19}F magnetic resonance. PLOS One, 9(2), e90589.
8. A. Wilson, L. Gonzalez, J. A. Pollock (2012). Evaluating learning and attitudes on tissue engineering: A study of children viewing animated digital dome shows detailing the biomedicine of tissue engineering. Tissue Engineering (Part A), 18(5-6), 576–586.
9. J. Ricou, J. A. Pollock (2012). The Tree, The Spiral And The Web of Life: A Visual Exploration. Leonardo Journal, 45(1), 18–25.
10. K. Lawrence, C. Stilley, J.A. Pollock, D. Webber, E. Quivers (2011). A family-centered educational program to promote independence in pediatric heart transplant recipients. Progress in Transplantation, 21(1), 61–66.
11. N.A. Siddall, G.R. Hime, J.A. Pollock, P. Batterham (2009). Ttk69-dependent repression of lozenge prevents the ectopic development of R7 cells in the Drosophila larval eye disc. Biomed Central: Developmental Biology, 9(64).
12. K. Jackson-Behan, J. Fair, S. Singh, M. Bogwitz, T. Perry, V. Grubor, F. Cunningham, C. Nichols, T. Cheung, P. Batterham and J.A. Pollock (2005). Alternative splicing removes an Ets interaction domain from Lozenge during Drosophila eye development. Development Genes and Evolution, 215(8), 423–435.
13. B. Gillo, I. Chorna, H. Cohen, B. Cook, I. Manistersky, 0. Devary, A. Arnon, A. Baumann, U. B. Kaupp, J. A. Pollock, Z. Selinger, B. Minke (1996). Co-expression of Drosophila TRP and TRPL in Xenopus oocytes reconstitutes a capacitative Ca^{2+} entry similar to the light-activated conductance. Proceedings of the National Academy of Sciences USA, 93(24), 14146–14151.
14. R. C. Hardie, A. Peretz, J. A. Pollock, B. Minke (1993). Ca^{2+} Limits the development of the lightresponse in Drosophila photoreceptors. Proceedings of the Royal Society B: Biological Sciences, 252(1335), 223–229.
15. J. A. Pollock and Seymour Benzer (1988). Transcript localization of four opsin genes In the three visual organs in Drosophila; RH2 is ocellus specific. Nature, 333(6175), 779–782.
16. U. Banerjee, P. J. Renfranz, J. A. Pollock, Seymour Benzer (1987). Molecular characterization and expression of sevenless, a gene involved in neural pattern formation in the Drosophila eye. Cell, 49(2), 281–291.
