= William Federspiel =

American bioengineer

Academic background
- Education: University of Rochester (BS, MS, PhD)

Academic work
- Institutions: McGowan Institute for Regenerative Medicine; University of Pittsburgh Medical Center; University of Pittsburgh; Johns Hopkins University; Boston University

William Federspiel is an American bioengineer. He is the John A. Swanson Professor of Bioengineering in the Department of Bioengineering at the University of Pittsburgh and Director of the Medical Devices Laboratory at the McGowan Institute for Regenerative Medicine.

== Early life and education ==
Federspiel enrolled at the University of Rochester for his entire post-secondary education. He completed his Bachelor of Science degree from the institution in 1978, his Master of Science in 1980, and his PhD in chemical engineering in 1983.

== Career ==
Following his PhD, Federspiel joined the bioengineer field as a principal staff scientist at ABIOMED Inc. and a research scientist at the Biomechanics Institute. He began his academic career on the faculty at Johns Hopkins University and Boston University before becoming an associate professor at the University of Pittsburgh (Pitt) in 1995. Upon joining Pitt, he immediately began working with cardiothoracic surgeon Brack Hattler on a device that could mimic gas exchange in the lungs. They subsequently co-founded Alung Technologies to produce the devices. In 1999, Federspiel was elected to the American Institute for Medical and Biological Engineering (AIMBE) College of Fellows for "outstanding contribution toward the development of implantable artificial lungs and quantifying oxygen exchange in living and artificial systems."

As their artificial lungs were being produced, Federspiel began exploring how to make them less cumbersome for the patients. His research team found that porous fibres coated with enzyme carbonic anhydrase could be broken down into CO_{2} by the fibres themselves, cutting down the rate at which blood needs to be fed to the artificial lung. This eventually led to the development of the Hemolung Respiratory Assist System (RAS), a device that could potentially replace ECMO. The device simultaneously extracts carbon dioxide and administers oxygen using a cylinder design with specially coated fibres that allow the gas exchange. Federspiel also began collaborating with colleague John Kellum to develop a device that could filter blood tainted with sepsis through a cartridge designed to remove the chemical molecules that orchestrate the body's innate immune system. By 2012, ALung's clinical trials on the Hemolung found that the RAS improved patients respiratory statuses and reduced arterial pCO_{2} levels by 28% within 24 hours.

The RAS was recognized in 2014 with the Gold Award in the Critical-Care and Emergency Medicine Category of the 17th Annual Medical Design Excellence Awards competition. As its creator, Federspiel was also an honorable mention for the 2014 Start-Up Entrepreneur Carnegie Science Award. By July 2014, the RAS was approved for use in 29 countries but remained under the United States' Food and Drug Administration (FDA) review. In 2017, the FDA approved of ALung's Investigational Device Exemption to conduct a clinical trial of the RAS for the treatment of adults with severe acute exacerbation of chronic obstructive pulmonary disease. The test was called the VENT-AVOID Trial, as it was the first clinical trial to try extracorporeal carbon dioxide removal for treating patients with COPD exacerbations. He was also elected to serve on the American Health Council's Education Board.

Alongside the RAS, Federspiel research team also developed the Paracorporeal Ambulatory Assist Lung (PAL). He had collaborated with researchers from Carnegie Mellon University and Mississippi State University to create PAL, a light wearable device which would remove blood through a plastic tube inserted into a vein instead of using stationary machines. This then led to the creation of the Pittsburgh Pediatric Ambulatory Lung (P-PAL) to assist children with lung failure by using oxygenation methods as a bridge to transplant or recovery. Federspiel's efforts were recognized in 2019 as he was elected a Fellow of the National Academy of Inventors. He was also appointed the John A. Swanson Professor of Bioengineering in the Department of Bioengineering at Pitt and received the 2019 Carnegie Science Award for Life Sciences.

At the beginning of the COVID-19 pandemic, Federspiel's RAS received Emergency Use Authorization from the FDA for use on COVID-19 patients. By January 2021, the RAS had been used on 75 COVID-19 patients where there was a selective issue with hypercarbic respiratory acidosis. The RAS helped stabilize patients with severe hypercarbic respiratory acidosis while providing lung protective ventilation. By April, the RAS had been used on a total of 97 COVID-19 patients. Federspiel also received Pitts' Marlin Mickle Outstanding Innovator Award for his "consistent dedication to achieving societal impact through commercial application of his research."
