= Clinical and Translational Science Award =

U.S. federal grant

Clinical and Translational Science Award (CTSA) is a type of U.S. federal grant administered by the National Center for Advancing Translational Sciences, part of the National Institutes of Health. The CTSA program began in October 2006 under the auspices of the National Center for Research Resources with a consortium of 12 academic health centers. The program was fully implemented in 2012, comprising 60 grantee institutions and their partners.

== Program overview ==
The CTSA program helps institutions create an integrated academic home for clinical and translational science with the resources to support researchers and research teams working to apply new knowledge and techniques to patient care. The program is structured to encourage collaborations among researchers from different scientific fields.

The CTSA program has raised awareness of clinical and translational science as a discipline among academic and industry researchers, philanthropists, government officials and the broader public.

== Strategic goals ==
CTSA consortium leaders have set five broad goals to guide their activities. These include building national clinical and translational research capability, providing training and improving career development of clinical and translational scientists, enhancing consortium-wide collaborations, improving the health of U.S. communities and the nation, and advancing T1 translational research to move basic laboratory discoveries and knowledge into clinical testing.

== Selected research areas ==
Institutions funded by the CTSA program are working with other research facilities to improve drug discovery and development. For example, several consortium institutions are collaborating with the Rat Resource and Research Center at the University of Missouri to increase the speed of drug screening so that drug research is translated into clinical uses more quickly. Consortium institutions also are creating new fields of study or new uses for technologies. For example, researchers at the University of Rochester are pioneering the field of lipidomics, exploring how lipids affect human disease. Their work has led to lipid research collaborations among experts in community and preventive medicine, proteomics, nutrition, and pharmaceutical research.

Some CTSA institutions are collaborating with community-based organizations to ensure research is translated successfully into clinical practice. Researchers at Duke University are working to prevent strokes by partnering with a local health care program to build stroke awareness among Latino immigrants.

Others are pursuing public and private partnerships to speed innovation. For example, the Oregon Health and Science University and Intel are developing new wireless devices with sensors to detect symptoms in patients who have diabetes or those at high risk of stroke so they can be treated earlier.

== Participating institutions ==
With the most recent awards, announced in July 2011, the consortium comprises 60 institutions in 30 states and the District of Columbia. These include:

- Albert Einstein College of Medicine (partnering with Montefiore Medical Center)
- Boston University
- Case Western Reserve University
- Columbia University
- Children's National Medical Center
- Emory University (partnering with Morehouse School of Medicine, Georgia Institute of Technology, and University of Georgia)
- Duke University
- Georgetown University with Howard University
- Harvard University
- Indiana University School of Medicine (partnering with Purdue University and University of Notre Dame)
- Johns Hopkins University
- Mayo Clinic
- Medical College of Wisconsin
- Medical University of South Carolina
- Mount Sinai School of Medicine
- New York University School of Medicine
- Northwestern University
- Ohio State University
- Oregon Health & Science University
- Penn State Milton S. Hershey Medical Center
- Rockefeller University
- Rutgers University
- Scripps Research Institute
- Stanford University
- Tufts University
- University of Alabama at Birmingham
- University of Arkansas for Medical Sciences
- University of California, Davis
- University of California, Irvine
- University of California Los Angeles
- University of California, San Diego
- University of California, San Francisco
- University of Chicago
- University of Cincinnati
- University of Colorado Denver
- University of Florida
- University of Kansas Medical Center
- University of Kentucky Research Foundations
- University of Massachusetts, Worcester
- University of Michigan
- University of New Mexico Health Sciences
- University of Minnesota
- University of North Carolina at Chapel Hill
- University of Illinois at Chicago
- University of Iowa
- University of Pennsylvania
- University of Pittsburgh
- University of Rochester School of Medicine and Dentistry
- University of Southern California
- University of Texas Health Science Center at Houston
- University of Texas Health Science Center at San Antonio
- University of Texas Medical Branch
- University of Texas Southwestern Medical Center at Dallas
- University of Utah
- University of Washington
- University of Wisconsin – Madison
- Vanderbilt University – CTSA Coordinating Center (partnering with Meharry Medical College)
- Virginia Commonwealth University
- Washington University in St. Louis
- Weill Cornell Medical College (partnering with Hunter College)
- Yale University

== Investigations by the Department of Health and Human Services Office of Inspector General (OIG) ==
On the 20 December 2011, the OIG published a report critical of the NIH's administration of the Clinical and Translational Science Awards (CTSA) program. The report read in part:

For all 38 Clinical and Translational Science Awards (CTSA) cooperative agreements awarded from 2006 through 2008, CTSA program staff did not document awardees' progress in compliance with NIH policy.

CTSA program staff must ensure that awardees submit annual progress reports and financial status reports, determine whether awardee progress remains satisfactory before awardees receive continued funding, and maintain official files in accordance with Department of Health and Human Services (HHS) policy. Additionally, under cooperative agreements, CTSA program staff provide assistance to awardees above and beyond the levels usually required for program stewardship of grants. This level of stewardship is known as substantial involvement. CTSA program staff assign NIH Project Scientists to awardees to provide this substantial involvement through technical assistance, advice, and coordination. Names of substantially involved staff and an annual summary of staff involvement should be documented in the official files.

CTSA program staff documented a comparison of accomplishments to research objectives for only 1 of 38 awardees throughout our review period. Although reviews for six awardees' files mentioned an inability to fulfill goals, only one file included a note from CTSA program staff regarding resolution. Also, most progress reports and half of financial status reports were late, yet the files contained no evidence that CTSA program staff took action to address timeliness of reports. CTSA program staff did not maintain files in accordance with HHS policy. Finally, no files contained evidence that CTSA program staff provided substantial involvement to awardees in accordance with Federal requirements and NIH policy.

We recommend that NIH ensure that CTSA program staff (1) document their monitoring of awardee progress; (2) ensure timely submission of required reports; (3) maintain official files in accordance with Federal policy; and (4) as required for cooperative agreements, provide substantial involvement to CTSA awardees. NIH concurred with our recommendations.

== See also ==
- List of medicine awards
