= Centers of Biomedical Research Excellence =

US research institute

Centers of Biomedical Research Excellence (COBRE), a component of the Institutional Development Award (IDeA) program, supports institutions via grants to advanced biomedical research. COBRE works through IDeA to build research capacity in states with low funding from the National Institute of Health (NIH). COBRE was a division of the National Center for Research Resources, before the NCRR was dissolved in 2011.

COBRE has two tracks for grantees, one which targets institutions without any research capacity in their proposed area of research, and one for institutions growing into an established area of research. The first track provides support for up to 15 years, and the latter 10 years. COBRE provides a principal investigator who is an established research scientist in the relevant field to grantees. Additionally, they set up three to five individual research projects which each come with one junior investigator, and each junior investigator also has at least one mentor.
