= Chandan K. Sen =

Indian-American scientist

Professor Chandan K Sen (2023)

Chandan K. Sen is an Indian-American scientist internationally recognized for his leadership in regenerative medicine and wound care innovation. He is widely known for pioneering research and transformative technologies that are advancing the science of tissue repair and improving patient outcomes. Sen currently serves as Director of the McGowan Institute for Regenerative Medicine at the University of Pittsburgh.

He holds the Bartley P. Griffith MD, FACS, FRCS Chair of Regenerative Medicine and is a tenured Professor of Surgery. In addition, he serves as Chief Scientific Officer for wound care services within the University of Pittsburgh Medical Center health system.

At the University of Pittsburgh, Professor Sen serves as Associate Vice Chancellor for Life Sciences Innovation and Commercialization. He is the current vice-chair and chair-elect of the National Institutes of Health’s Diabetic Foot Consortium. Sen also serves as President-Elect (2027–2028) of the national Wound Healing Society. On February 13, 2024, Pennsylvania State Representatives, chaired by Rep. Chris Pielli (D-Chester), convened a hearing on the impact of generative AI. Dr. Sen led the panel on AI and Healthcare, contributing expert insights on the integration of artificial intelligence in clinical practice.

Founded in 1992, the McGowan Institute for Regenerative Medicine was originally established as the McGowan Center for Artificial Organ Development. Professor Sen relocated to Pittsburgh in July 2023, bringing a large team of scientists from Indiana.

From 2018 to 2023, Sen served as an Indiana University Distinguished Professor. At Indiana University, he directed the Indiana Center for Regenerative Medicine and Engineering (ICRME) and held the J. Stanley Battersby Chair as Distinguished Professor of Surgery. He also served as Associate Dean of Research and Associate Vice President of Research. In 2020, Sen was awarded the Bicentennial Medal by the Indiana University President's Office.

In 2021, Sen was elected as a Lifetime Fellow of the National Academy of Inventors. He currently serves as Editor-in-Chief of Antioxidants & Redox Signaling and Advances in Wound Care. In March 2026, the American Diabetes Association announced Sen as winner of the 2026 Roger E Pecoraro award.

Sen is widely recognized for co-inventing tissue nanotransfection, a technology enabling in vivo tissue reprogramming. His team also identified vasculogenic fibroblasts in humans.

His research also spans electroceutical approaches to infection management and the role of tocotrienol forms of natural vitamin E. Sen served as the principal investigator for the NIH Diabetic Foot Consortium TEWL study. The study recommended revising the FDA definition of wound closure to include restoration of skin barrier function, as wounds with high transepidermal water loss (TEWL) were more likely to recur.

Sen has an H-index of 125.

== Education ==
Chandan Sen earned his Bachelor of Science degree (Honors in Physiology) in 1987 and his Master of Science in Human Physiology in 1990 from the Rajabazar Science College at Calcutta University.

He subsequently moved to Finland for advanced studies and received his Ph.D. in Physiology in 1994 from the School of Medicine at the University of Eastern Finland (Kuopio Campus). In January 1995, Sen joined the University of California, Berkeley for postdoctoral research in the Department of Molecular and Cell Biology, focusing on redox signaling (1995–1996).

In 1997, Sen accepted his first faculty appointment at the Lawrence Berkeley National Laboratory in Berkeley, California.

== Career and Discoveries ==
In 2000, Sen joined The Ohio State University, where he was promoted to full professor with tenure in 2004 and later awarded the John H. & Mildred C. Lumley Endowed Chair of Surgery. At Ohio State, he also served as Associate Dean of Research. Sen was the founding Executive Director of the OSU Comprehensive Wound Center and the founding Director of the OSU Center for Regenerative Medicine & Cell-Based Therapies. His research at Ohio State focused on tissue injury, repair, regeneration, and infection, including studies on stroke, tissue reprogramming, and cutaneous wound healing. This work led to the development of Tissue Nanotransfection (TNT) technology for in vivo tissue reprogramming, published in Nature Nanotechnology. TNT received a 2018 Edison Awards for Innovation. Sen's work also advanced electroceutical approaches for managing tissue infection, earning the Frost & Sullivan Award for New Product Innovation. In 2021, he was elected a Lifetime Fellow of the National Academy of Inventors.

In 2018, the Indianapolis Business Journal described Sen as “one of the world's leading experts in the nascent field of regenerative medicine” when he joined Indiana University as Director of the Indiana Center for Regenerative Medicine and Engineering (ICRME), Executive Director of IU Health Comprehensive Wound Center, J. Stanley Battersby Chair and Professor of Surgery, Associate Vice President of Research, and Associate Dean for Entrepreneurial Research. He brought a team of 30 researchers and $10 million in research funding. Sen also holds a courtesy appointment as Professor of Biomedical Engineering at the Weldon School of Biomedical Engineering, Purdue University. His research continues to focus on nanotechnology-based strategies for tissue regeneration.

During the COVID-19 pandemic, Sen's team demonstrated that electrical fields can inactivate coronavirus, leading to the development of electroceutical fabrics for personal protective equipment. Following a successful pilot study on wound biofilm infection at the San Antonio Military Medical Center, the technology was funded by the U.S. Department of Defense for testing on war wounds in Ukraine.

In 2025, the NIDDK Diabetic Foot Consortium published its first completed clinical study—the TEWL study. Sen served as lead principal investigator for this landmark trial, which proposed redefining the clinical wound closure endpoint. The study introduced transepidermal water loss (TEWL) as a biomarker for wound recurrence, highlighting that wounds appearing closed but lacking barrier function—termed “invisible wounds”—carry a higher risk of reopening. This paradigm shift emphasizes that wound closure must include restoration of barrier function, a critical metric for clinical decision-making, regulatory approval, and reimbursement in wound care.

== Books ==
- Skeletal Muscle Research: Cellular Physiology & Biochemistry (ed. with M. J. Kankaanpää) (1993)
- Skeletal Muscle Research: Metabolism & Pathophysiology (ed. with L. Packer and O. Hänninen) (1994)
- Exercise and Oxygen Toxicity (ed. with M. Atalay) (1994)
- Oxidative Stress In Skeletal Muscles (ed. with Reznick, A et al.) (1998)
- Antioxidant and Redox Regulation of Genes. 2000. doi:10.1016/B978-0-12-636670-9.X5000-4. ISBN 978-0-12-636670-9.
- Handbook of Oxidants & Antioxidants in Exercise (ed. with L. Packer and O. Hänninen) (2000)
- Methods in Enzymology: Redox Cell Biology & Genetics - Parts A and B (ed. with L. Packer) (2002)
- Methods in Enzymology: Oxygen Sensing (ed. with G. L. Semenza) (2004)
- Advances in Wound Care - Volume 1 (2010)
- Advances in Wound Care - Volume 2 (2011)
- Nutrition and Enhanced Sports Performances (ed. with Bagchi D. and Nair S.) (2013)
- MicroRNA in Regenerative Medicine. 2015. doi:10.1016/C2012-0-02839-6. ISBN 978-0-12-405544-5.
