= National Center for Research Resources =

US research center

- Formation: 1990
- Dissolved: 2011
- Region served: United States
- Parent organization: National Institutes of Health
- Website: http://www.ncrr.nih.gov/

The National Center for Research Resources (NCRR) was a center within the National Institutes of Health, a United States government agency. NCRR provided funding to laboratory scientists and researchers for facilities and tools in the goal of curing and treating diseases.

== Organization and history ==
The National Center for Research Resources (NCRR) was one of the 27 institutes and centers that make up the National Institutes of Health (NIH) within the Department of Health and Human Services of the federal government of the United States. The NIH is one of eight agencies under the Public Health Service (PHS) in the Department of Health and Human Services (HHS).

In 1990 the Division of Research Resources and the Division of Research Services were merged to form the National Center for Research Resources. Its mission statement declares that it "provides laboratory scientists and clinical researchers with environments and tools that they can use to prevent, detect, and treat a wide range of diseases."

NCRR was abolished in December 2011 as part of an NIH reorganization to create the National Center for Advancing Translational Sciences (NCATS). Several of NCRR's programs were reassigned to other NIH institutes and centers.

== Role ==
NCRR administered, fostered, and supported the development of research resources for health-related research. Programs were carried out through: (a) research grants, research and development contracts, and individual and institutional research training awards; (b) cooperation and collaboration with organizations and institutions engaged in multi-categorical research resources activities; and (c) collection and dissemination of information on research and findings in these areas.

The NCRR funded research concentrated in four programmatic Divisions: Division for Biomedical Technology Research and Research Resources, Division for Clinical Research Resources, Division of Comparative Medicine, and Division of Research Infrastructure.

NCRR's Major Extramural Programs included:

Division for Biomedical Technology Research and Research Resources

- Biomedical Technology (BT) Resource Centers
- Biomedical Informatics Research Network (BIRN)
- Shared Instrumentation Grant (SIG)
- High-End Instrumentation (HEI)

Division for Clinical Research Resources

- Clinical and Translational Science Awards
- General Clinical Research Centers (GCRCs)
- National Gene Vector Laboratories (NGVLs)
- Rare Diseases Clinical Research Network
- Islet Cell Resource (ICR) Centers
- Human Tissues and Organs Resource
- Science Education Partnership Award (SEPA)

Division of Comparative Medicine

- National Primate Research Centers (NPRCs)
- Laboratory Animal Sciences (LAS)
- Animal Models
- Biological Models and Materials Research (BMMR)
- NIH Chimpanzee Management Program

Division of Research Infrastructure

- Research Centers in Minority Institutions (RCMI)
- Institutional Development Award (IDeA)
- Research and Animal Facilities Improvements (RFI and AFI)

== See also ==
- Centers of Biomedical Research Excellence
