= National Aviary =

Zoo in Pittsburgh, Pennsylvania, US

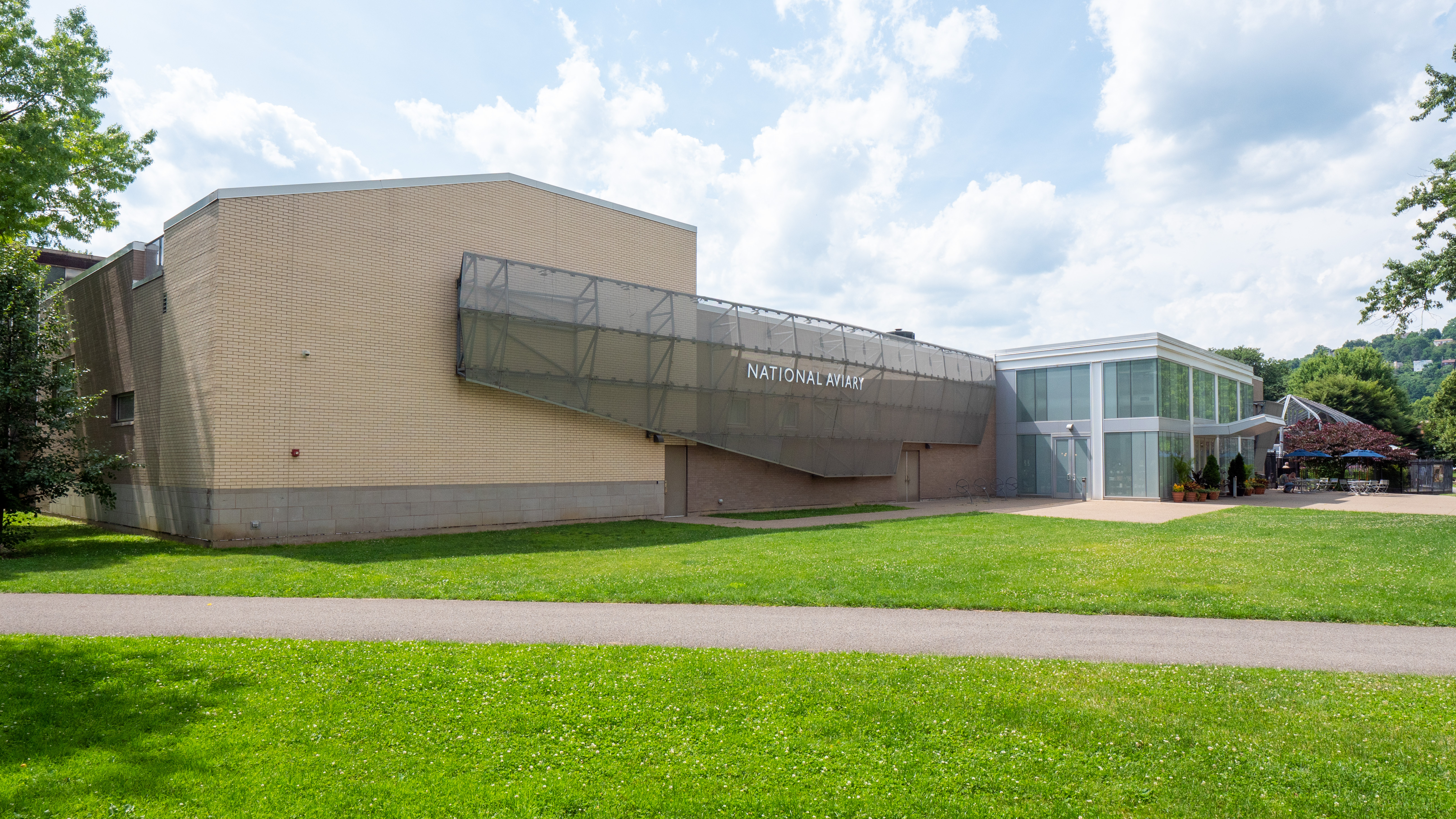
- The National Aviary's Arch Street Entrance
- Interactive map of National Aviary
- 40.4533°N 80.01°W
- Slogan: Working to inspire respect for nature through an appreciation of birds.
- Date opened: Established in 1952; Went private in 1991; earned National designation in 1993
- Location: Allegheny Commons Park; 700 Arch Street Pittsburgh, PA, 15212 United States
- No. of animals: 500+
- No. of species: 150+
- Annual visitors: 100,000+
- Memberships: Association of Zoos and Aquariums (AZA), Allegheny Regional Asset District (RAD)
- Public transit: North Side
- Website: www.aviary.org

The National Aviary, located in Pittsburgh, Pennsylvania, is the only independent indoor nonprofit aviary in the United States. The facility is also the country's largest indoor aviary, and the only one accorded honorary "National" status by the United States Congress.

The Aviary is home to more than 500 birds, other animals, and reptiles representing more than 150 species. The aviary has been a member of the Association of Zoos and Aquariums (AZA) since 1984.

== Location and features ==
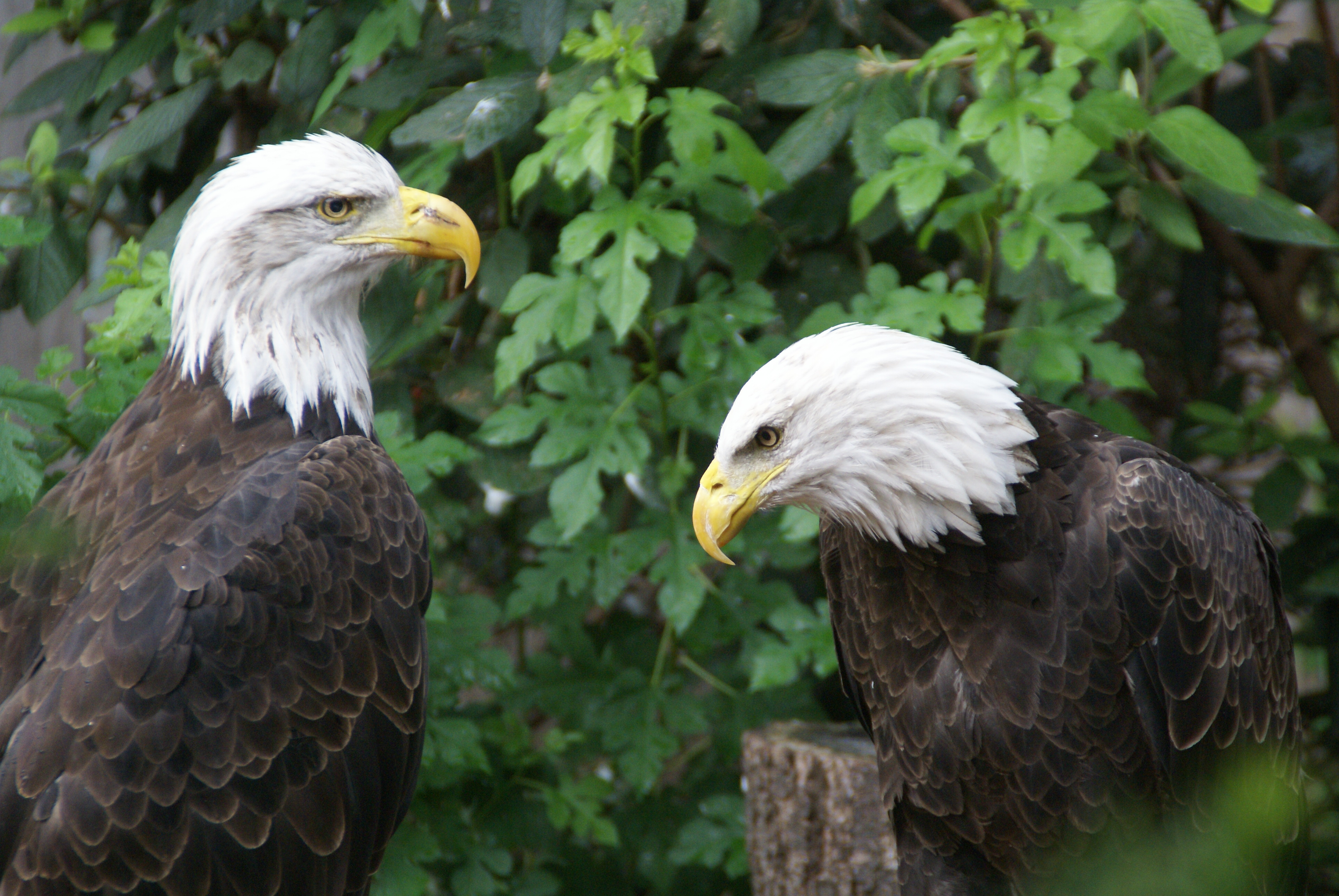
Bald eagles (Haliaeetus leucocephalus), designated as the national bird of the United States, are a popular species in the National Aviary.

The National Aviary is located at 700 Arch Street on Pittsburgh's Northside, within Allegheny Commons Park in the Allegheny Center neighborhood.

The National Aviary offers daily interactive experiences for visitors, including limited-time activities that change seasonally. Guests can watch an African Penguin Feeding at Penguin Point – an indoor/outdoor habitat that offers opportunities for underwater viewing. For a closer experience with African Penguins, guests can step into Penguin Point to hand-feed the colony alongside an Aviary expert during a Penguin Feeding Encounter or opt for a Penguin Encounter (both for additional fees).

The Aviary also incorporates daily Tropical Rainforest and Wetlands Feedings, both of which take place inside of those immersive habitats. These regularly scheduled programs are offered alongside additional engaging expert talks, free-flight bird shows, interactive play spaces for kids, and additional encounters that help to create an educational and immersive experience for visitors.

== Birds ==
The Aviary is home to more than 500 birds and other animals of more than 150 species, many of which are threatened or endangered in the wild. As a result, the Aviary has many species that are rarely found in other zoos or aviaries, such as Andean condors and the Critically Endangered Vietnam pheasant, which has not been seen in the wild since 2000. Among the most popular residents are Tropical Rainforest inhabitants Sapphira and Jewel, who are vibrant hyacinth macaws, as well as Wookiee the Linnaeus's two-toed sloth.

== Conservation ==
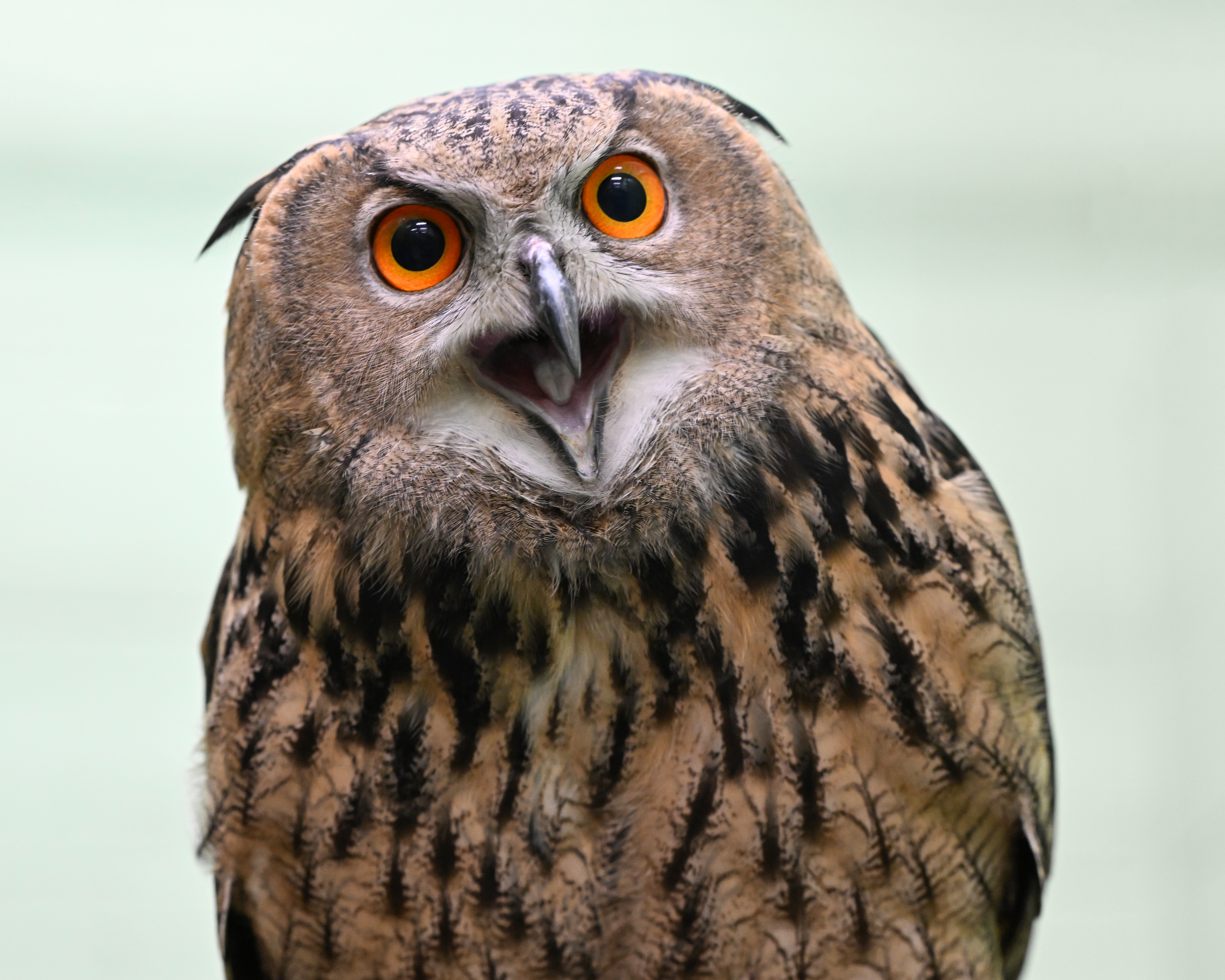
The Eurasian eagle-owl is one of the species where conservation work has been done.

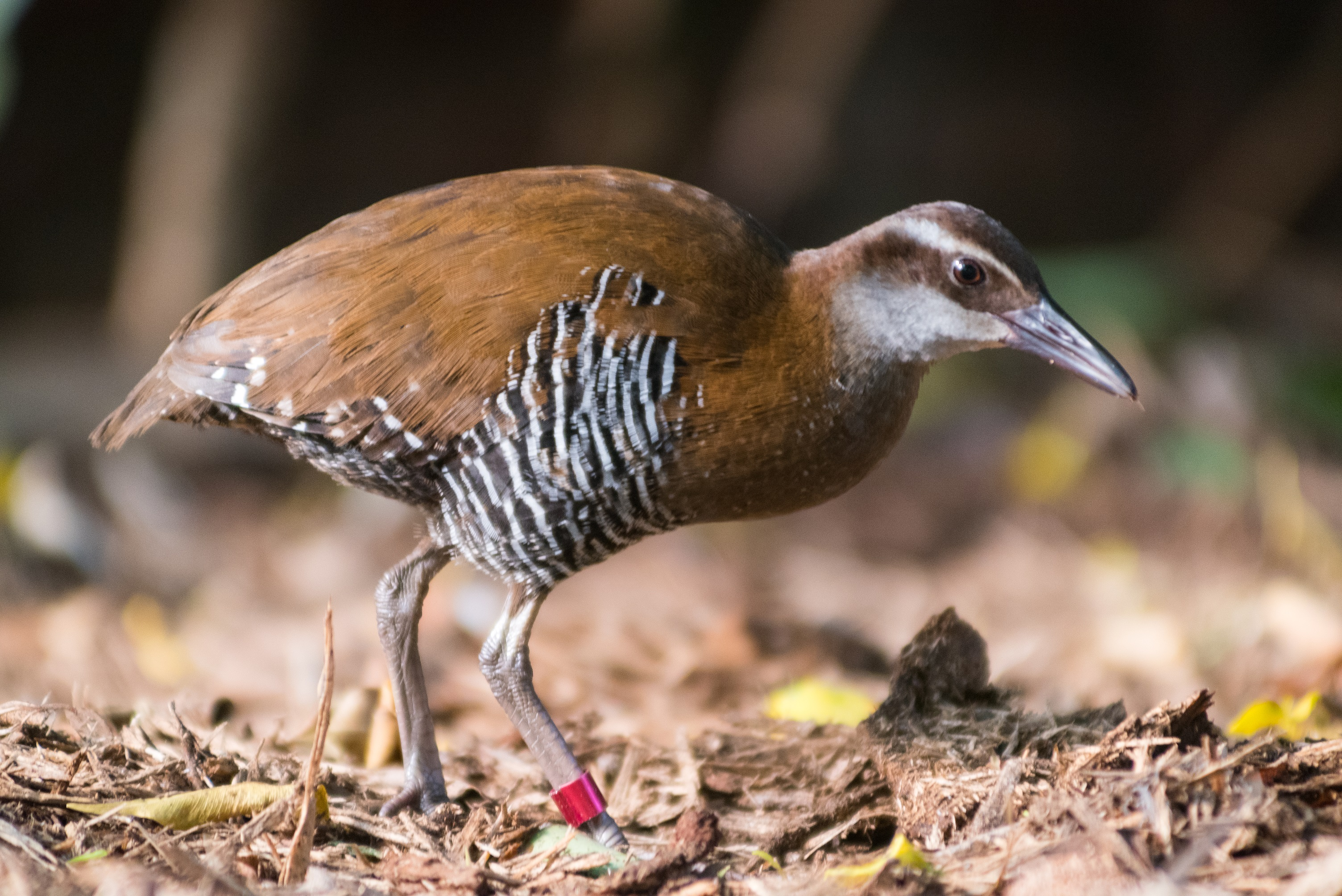
Guam rail conservation work has led to this species no longer being extinct in the wild.

The National Aviary also takes part in Species Survival Plans designed to enhance conservation efforts for species, including the Bali Myna (nearly Extinct in the Wild), the Extinct in the Wild Guam kingfisher, the Vietnam Pheasant, and the Critically Endangered African penguin. These accredited SSP programs seek to maintain genetic viability and population growth.

The Aviary's first two African penguin chicks hatched in February 2012. Since this inaugural hatching, the National Aviary has welcomed more than a dozen African Penguin chicks, leading to its leadership role of the Saving Animals From Extinction (SAFE) program for the African Penguin, an AZA-led initiative to address the variety of problems wild African penguins are facing.

On March 13, 2013, the Aviary celebrated another success of its breeding program when a female Eurasian owlet hatched and within five days, doubled in size. Since this first owlet, the National Aviary has expanded its Eurasian Eagle-Owl conservation efforts, including the hatching of more than a dozen chicks.

The National Aviary not only hatches species for population growth, they also work with various collaborators on decades-long initiatives to bring said populations into the wild.

In 2019, the Guam rail was downgraded by the International Union for Conservation of Nature (IUCN) from Extinct in the Wild status to Critically Endangered. This is only the second-ever bird species to receive a downlisting, behind the California condor. As of 2020, more Guam Rails have been hatched at the National Aviary than at any other North American zoo.

One species that could be downgraded next: the Guam kingfisher. In 2024, nine Guam kingfishers (known by the Chamoru people as sihek) were released into the wild on Palmyra Atoll as part of the Sihek Recovery Program. Three of these birds hatched at the National Aviary – marking the first time a small population of this species has lived in the wild since 1988. More releases of this Extinct-in-the-Wild species are planned for 2025.

== History and funding ==
The National Aviary began as part of the Pittsburgh Aviary-Conservatory, built by the city in 1952 on the site of the former North Side Conservatory. Initially consisting of a single structure of 3,640 square feet, a 1967 expansion increased space to 25,000 square feet, including the "wetlands room". Pittsburgh's dwindling urban tax base forced the city to cease funding the institution in 1991.

=== Public to private ===
In 1991, neighborhood leaders founded Save the Aviary, Inc. and began a public campaign to raise money and develop a plan to privatize the Aviary. Jill Sims, an active volunteer at the Aviary, became the first chairperson of the organization. Mark P. Masterson, a Northside community leader, developed a business plan and secured funding from the Buhl Foundation to produce a capital improvement plan and recruited additional board members. Save the Aviary, Inc. took over the facility and began operations soon after the board of directors hired Dayton Baker as executive director.

=== National status ===
On October 27, 1993, by declaration of the U.S. Congress, the Pittsburgh Aviary was designated an honorary national status and renamed the National Aviary in Pittsburgh. This was later signed by President Bill Clinton on November 8, 1993. A capital campaign was undertaken in 1995 to raise funds for essential renovations, completed in 1997, that modernized the facility. In January 2005, the National Aviary created the Department of Conservation and Field Research, which so far has mainly focused on restoring bird populations in foreign countries with histories of extreme environmental degradation.

In July 2006, the Commonwealth of Pennsylvania granted the first $500,000 toward a $22.5 million project that would include a new education center and expanded exhibits, which was slated for opening in 2008. In October 2008, the Aviary announced a $23 million renovation and expansion of exhibition space, the vast majority of which would be paid for by private foundations.

=== Recent history ===
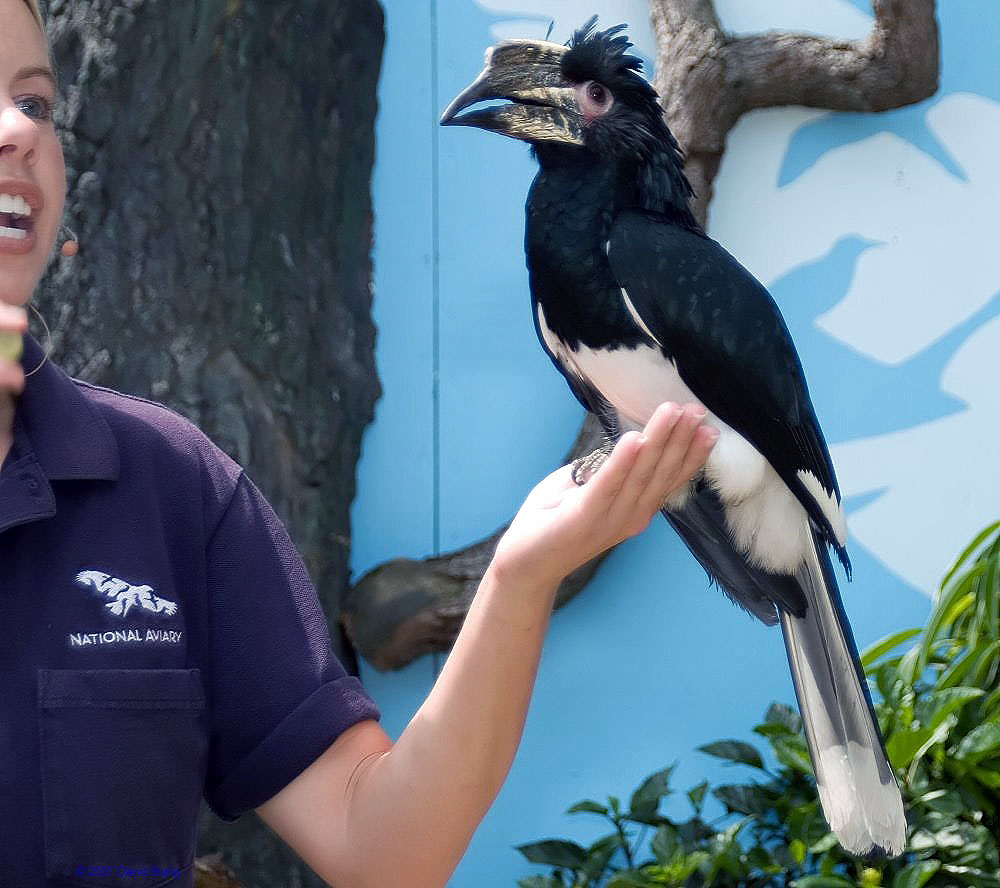
Trumpeter hornbill (Bycanistes bucinator).

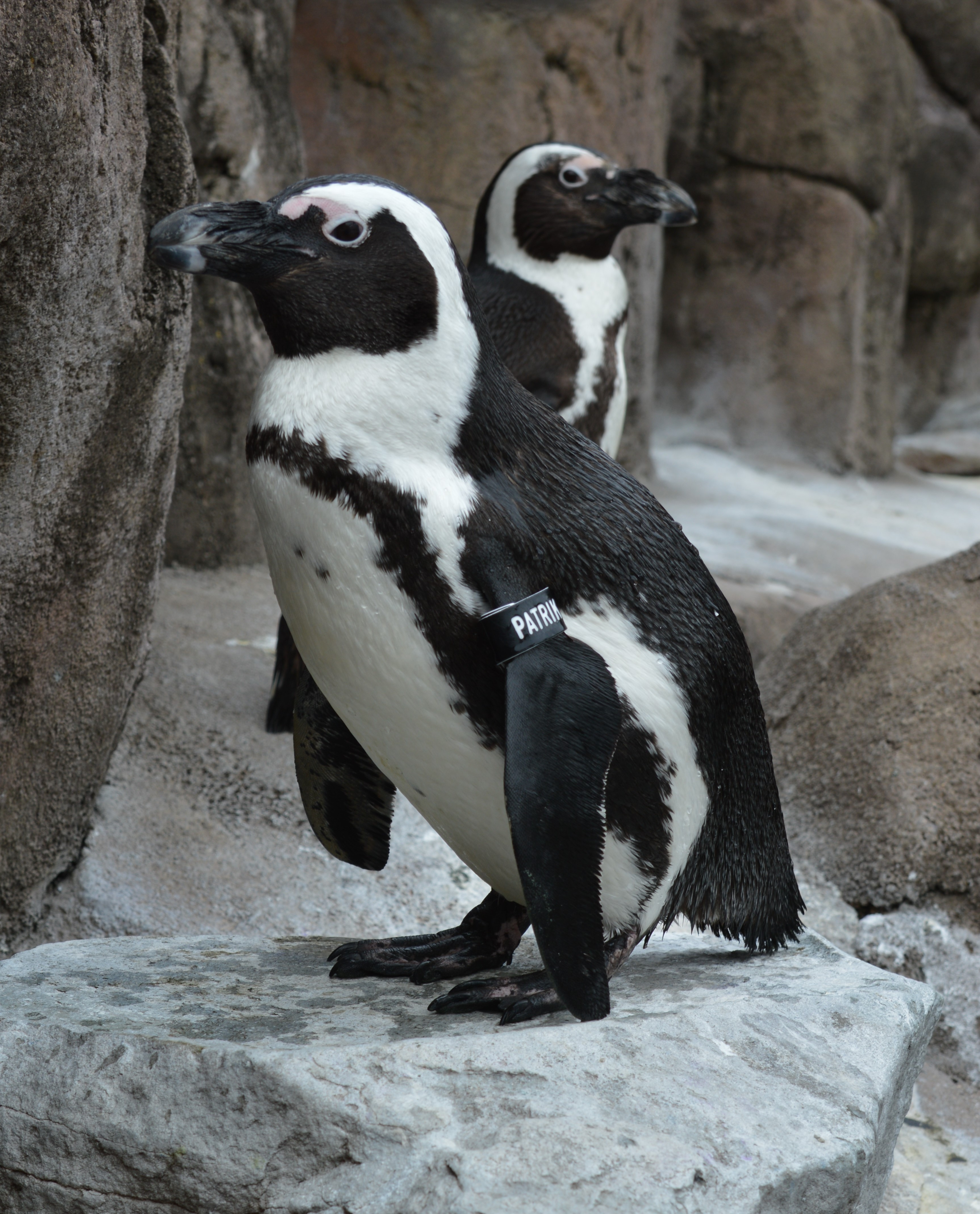
African penguins (Spheniscus demersus) in the Penguin Point habitat

Cheryl Tracy has served as the National Aviary's Executive Director since July 1, 2013. Preceding Tracy in the executive director position were Patrick Mangus, who served from January 2009 to November 2012, Linda Dickerson from April 2007 to January 2009, and Dayton Baker from 1991 to 2007.

As of March 2020, Jane Dixon is the President on the Board of Trustees.

Under Tracy's leadership, the National Aviary has undertaken several capital campaigns, including the completion of the $17.5 million “Taking Flight” campaign, which included the creation of the Penguin Point habitat, home to a colony of Critically Endangered African Penguins. In the fall of 2010, the National Aviary completed an $18.5 million expansion and renovation project that included the opening of a new café, classrooms, and the Helen M. Schmidt FliteZone Theater. The Helen M. Schmidt FliteZone Theater is the first indoor theater in the nation built specifically for bird shows. The Aviary also began outdoor shows (weather permitting) from its rooftop theater, SkyDeck, featuring live flight demonstrations of vultures, falcons, and other birds of prey over Allegheny Commons Park.

The National Aviary opened The Garden Room, a 9,000-square-foot year-round event and education venue, in October 2020.

On September 25, 2021, a Steller's sea eagle named Kodiak, or Kody, got out of his habitat. After a coordinated effort involving National Aviary staff and volunteers, and with the support of community members reporting sightings, Kodiak returned safely to the National Aviary on October 3, 2021. In 2024, the Aviary welcomed a second, unnamed Steller's Sea Eagle, a female from Estonia. Through a community naming contest, which raised more than $14,000 for the Aviary's conservation efforts, the name “Aurora” was chosen for Kody's new mate.

In 2022, the National Aviary completed the renovation of its largest immersive habitat: the Wetlands. More than 20,000 square feet of brand-new, energy-efficient bird-safe glass was installed, as well as brand-new perches and landscaping.

Towards the end of 2024, the Aviary completed minor renovations to its Grasslands habitat, which is home to small songbirds including red siskins, owl finches, and speckled mousebirds. With support from the Allegheny Regional Asset District (RAD), the habitat was revamped with new skylights offering maximum UV transmittance, as well as new greenery and improved nesting areas.

In January 2025, the National Aviary announced a partnership with the SK Rockwell Conservancy to build a first-of-its-kind world-class avian care center, which will include breeding Endangered species, a state-of-the-art veterinary and teaching hospital. The proposed site of this endeavor is the Shadyside Middle School. With a continued focus on biodiversity, the Aviary welcomed several new-to-the-Aviary mammal and reptile species in early 2025.

== Gallery ==
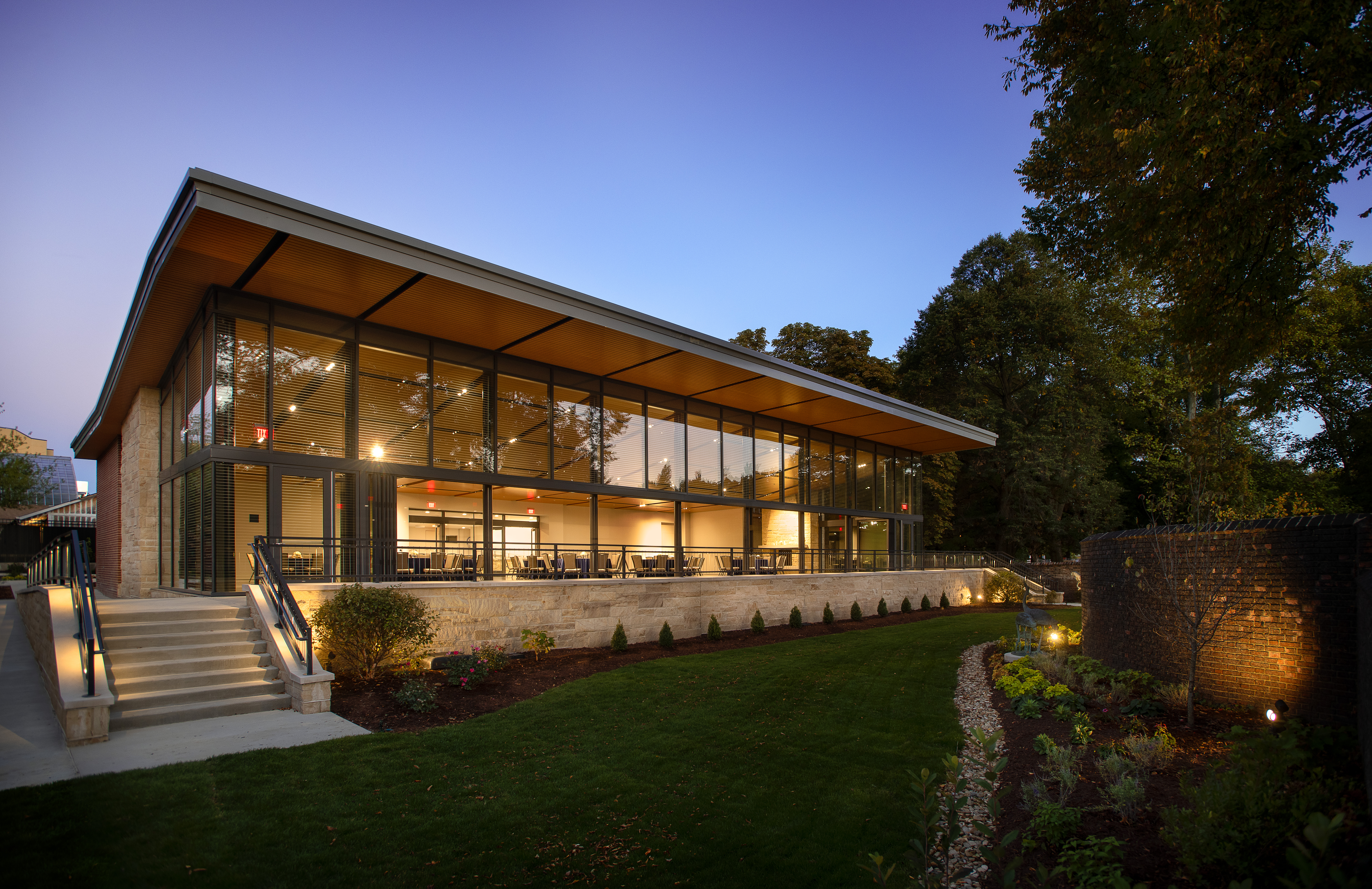
The exterior of The Garden Room and Rose Garden.

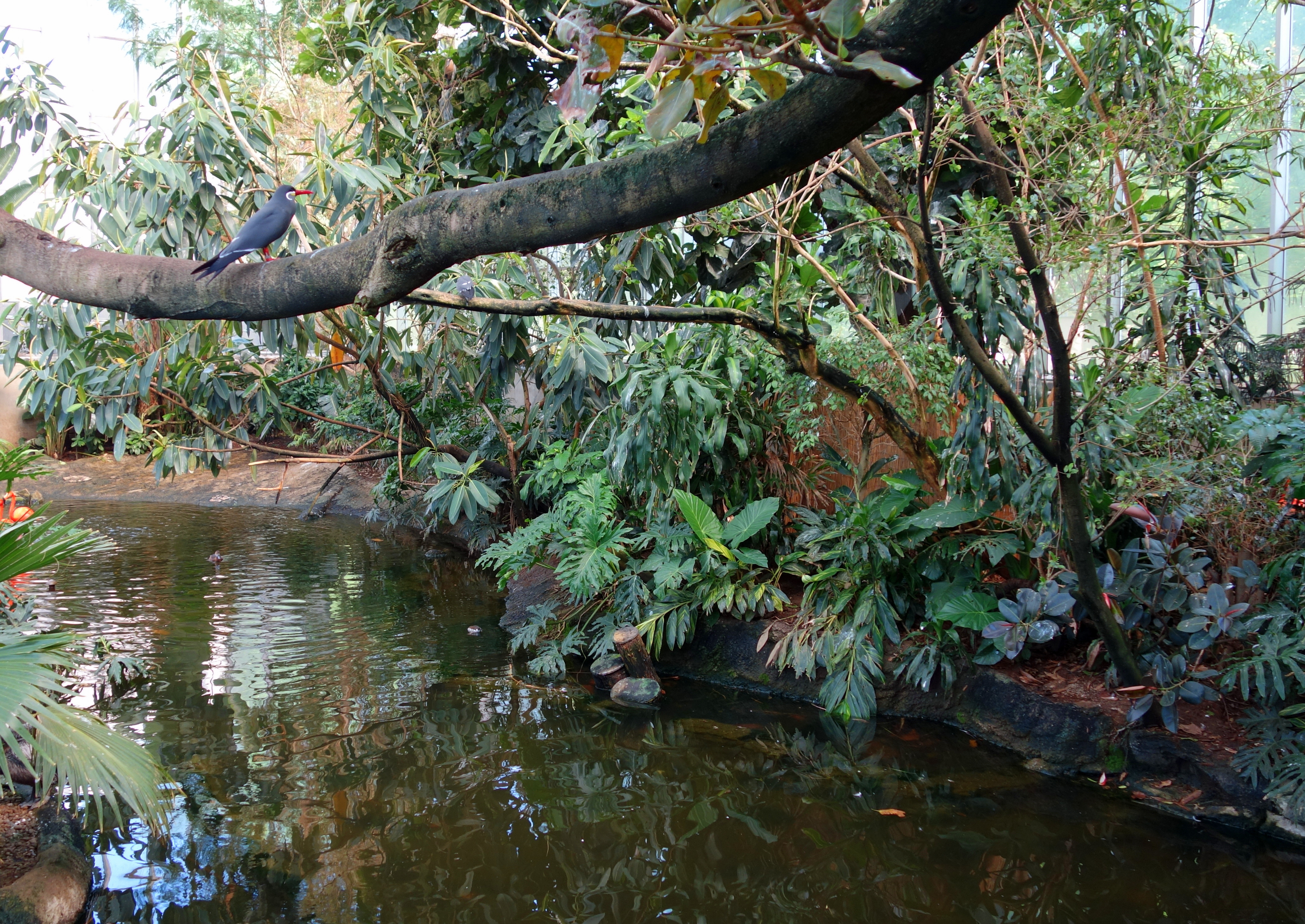
An interior view of one area of the aviary.

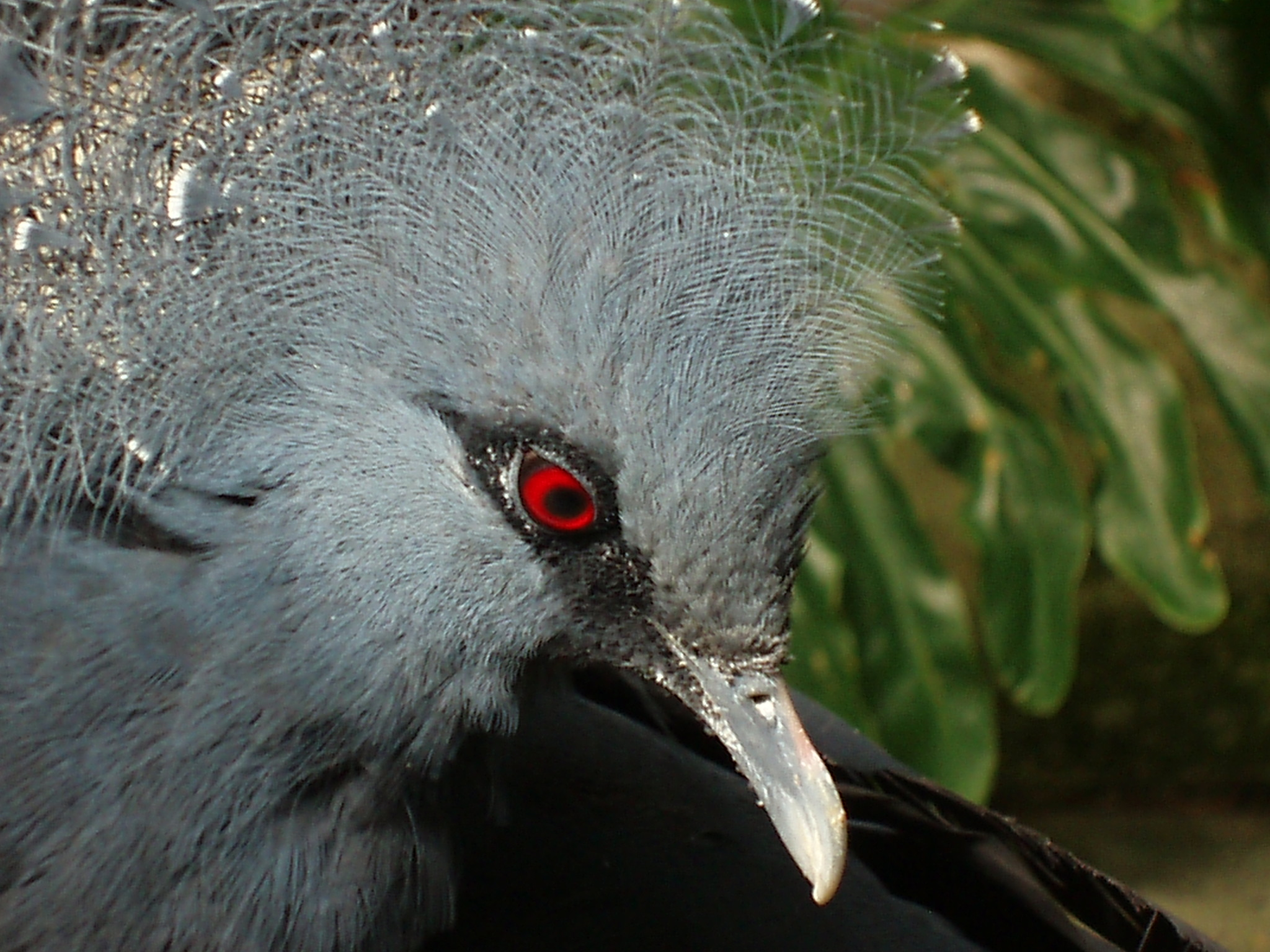
A close-up of a Victoria crowned pigeon.

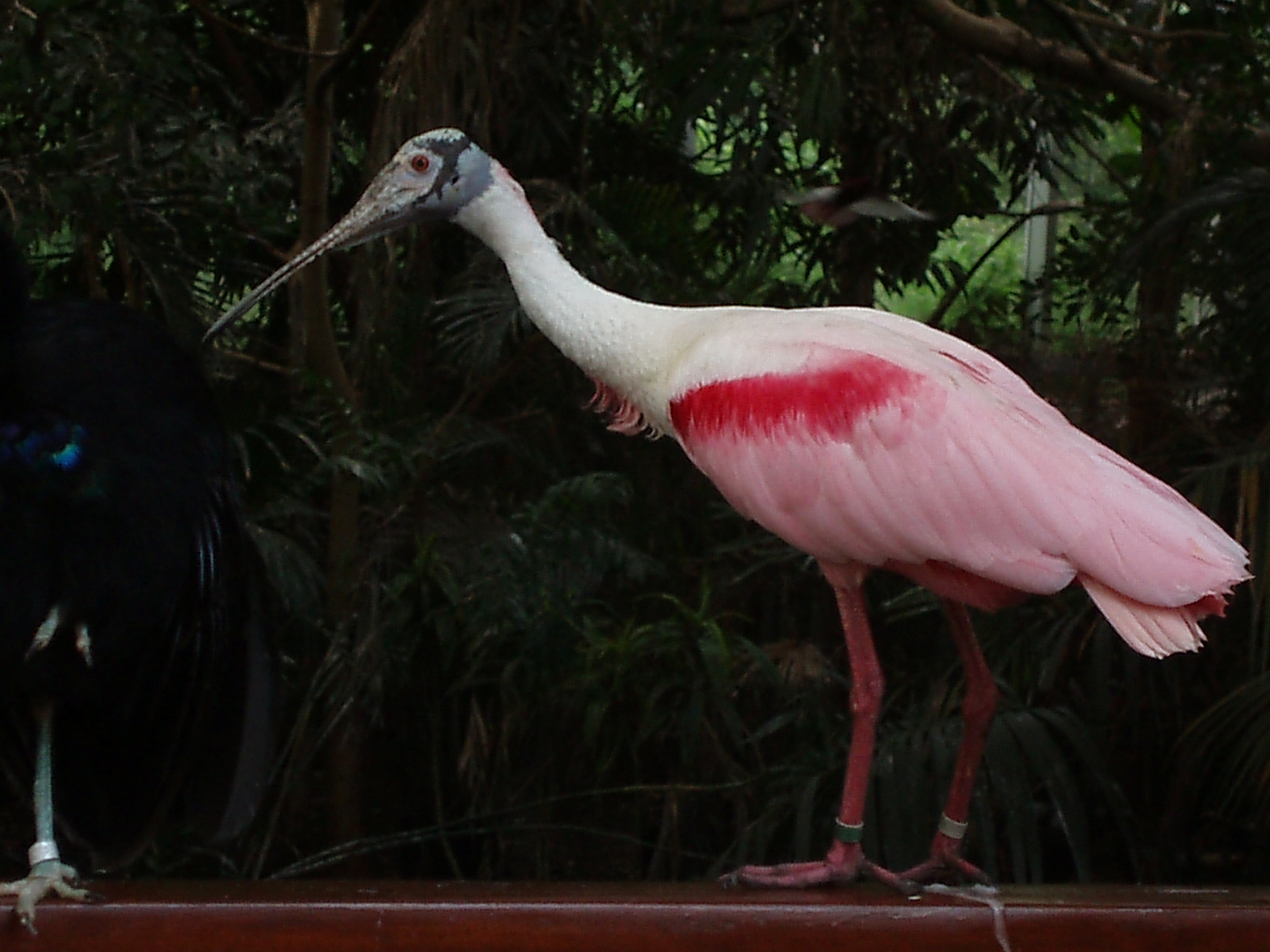
A roseate spoonbill.

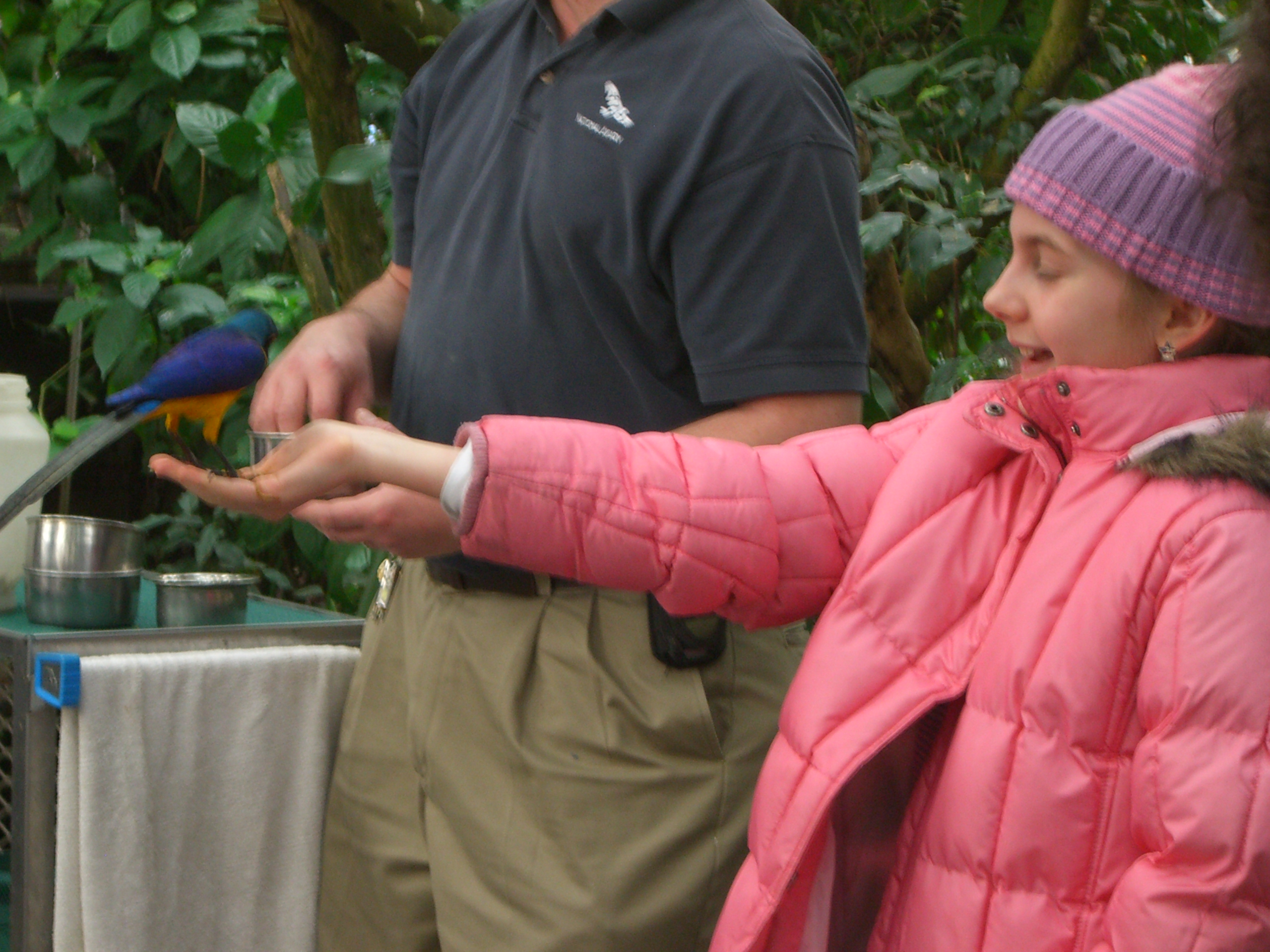
A girl feeds worms to a golden-breasted starling.

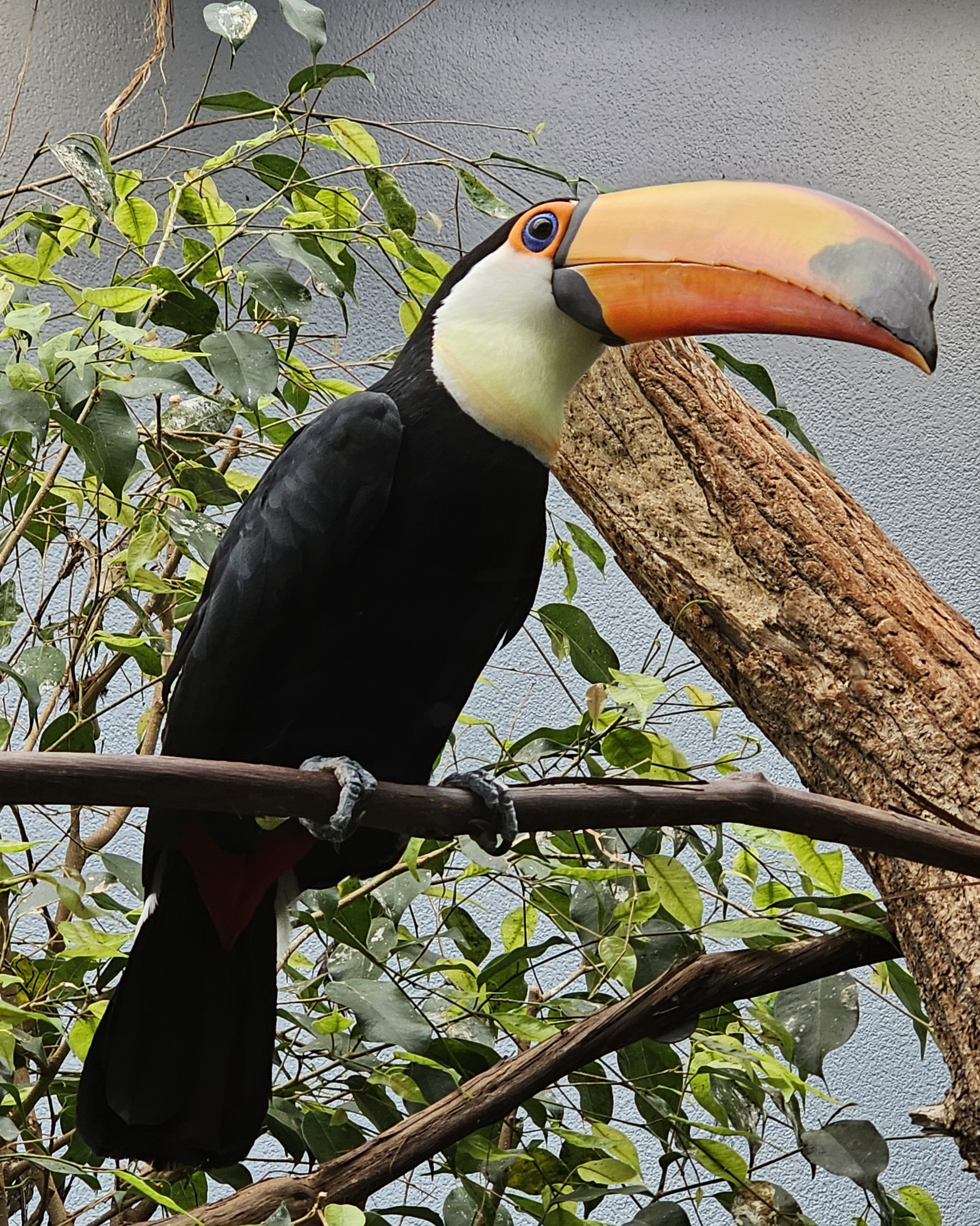
A toco toucan.

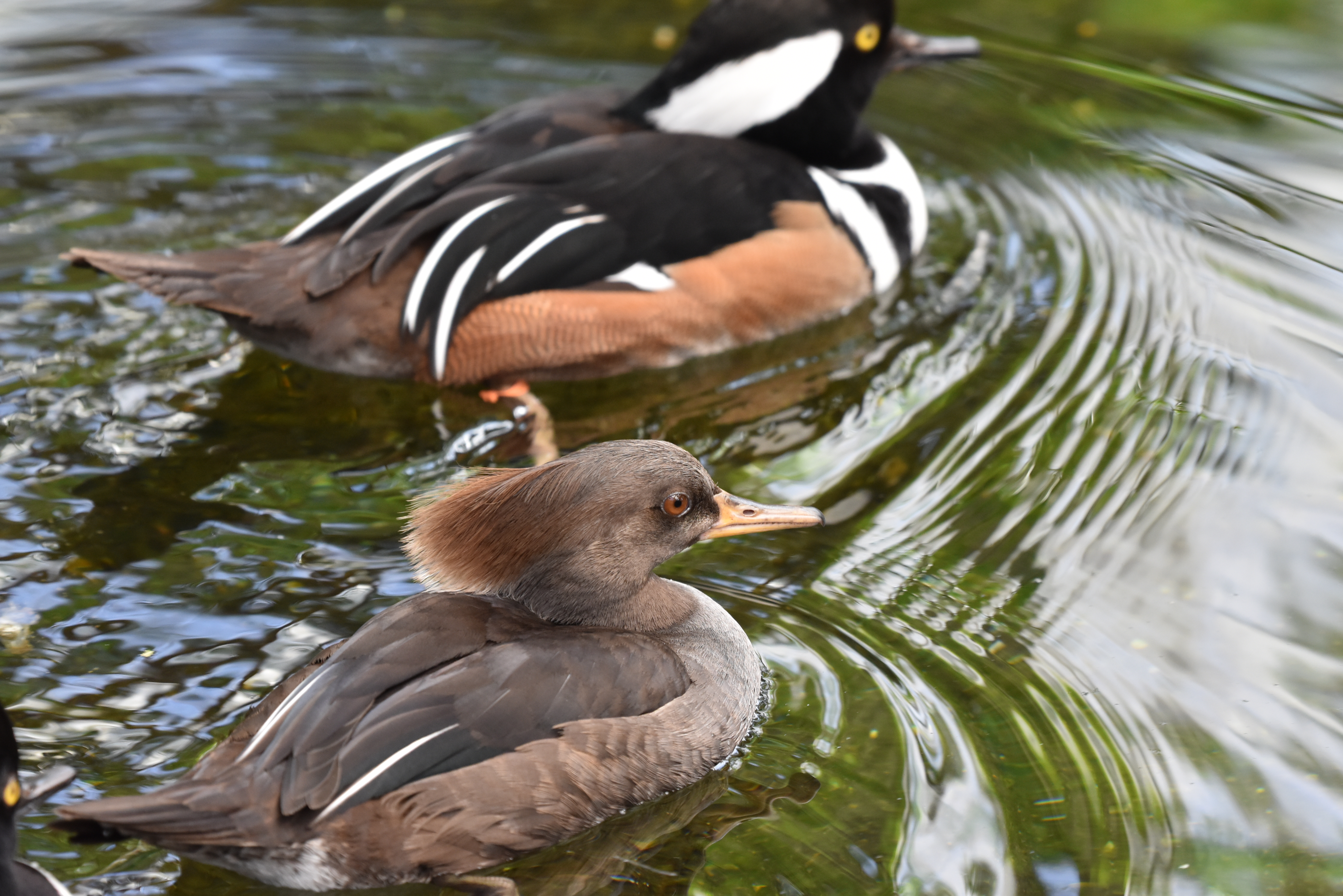
Hooded merganser.

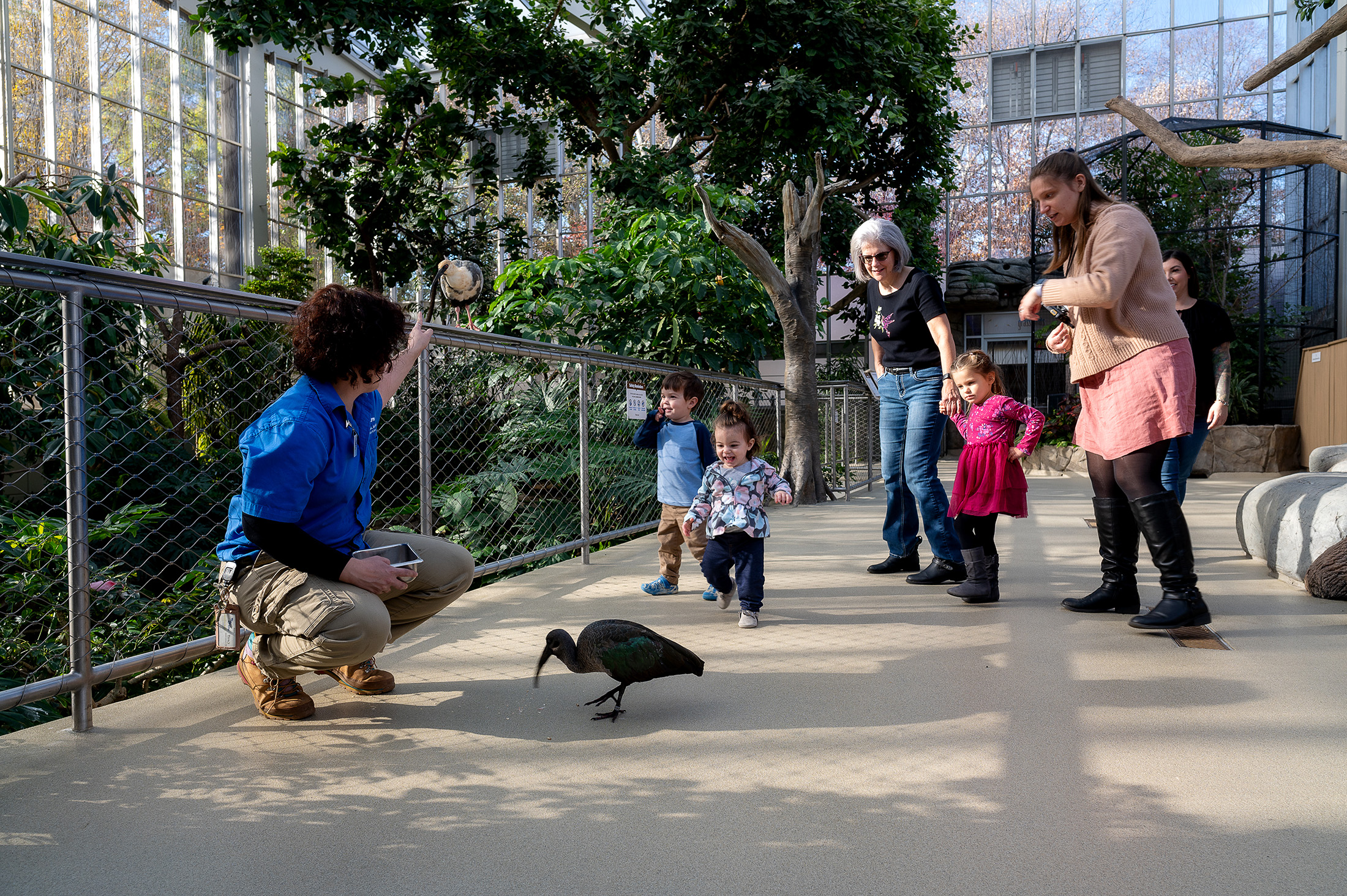
Guests attending a feeding in the Wetlands Habitat.

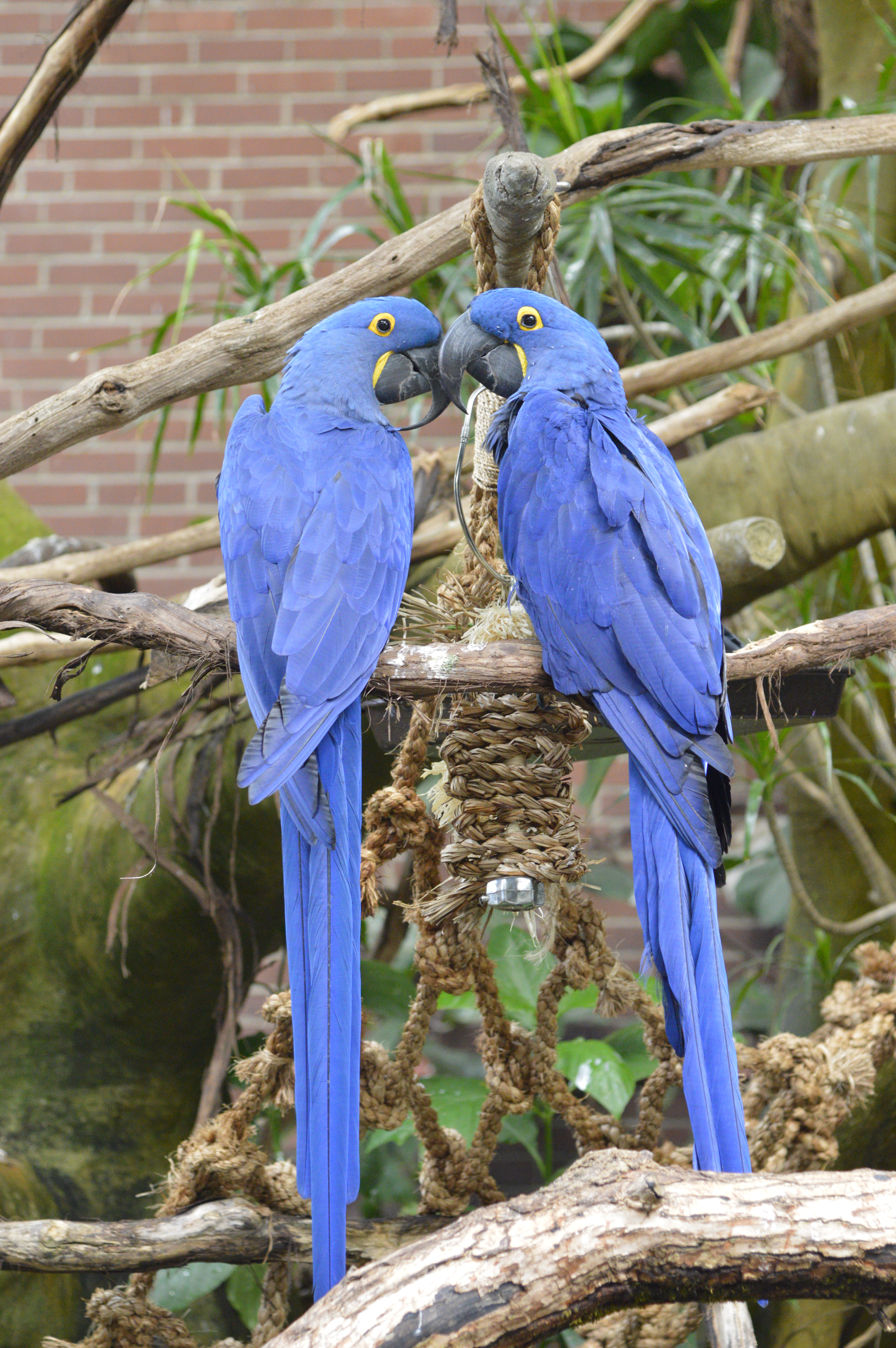
Two hyacinth macaws.

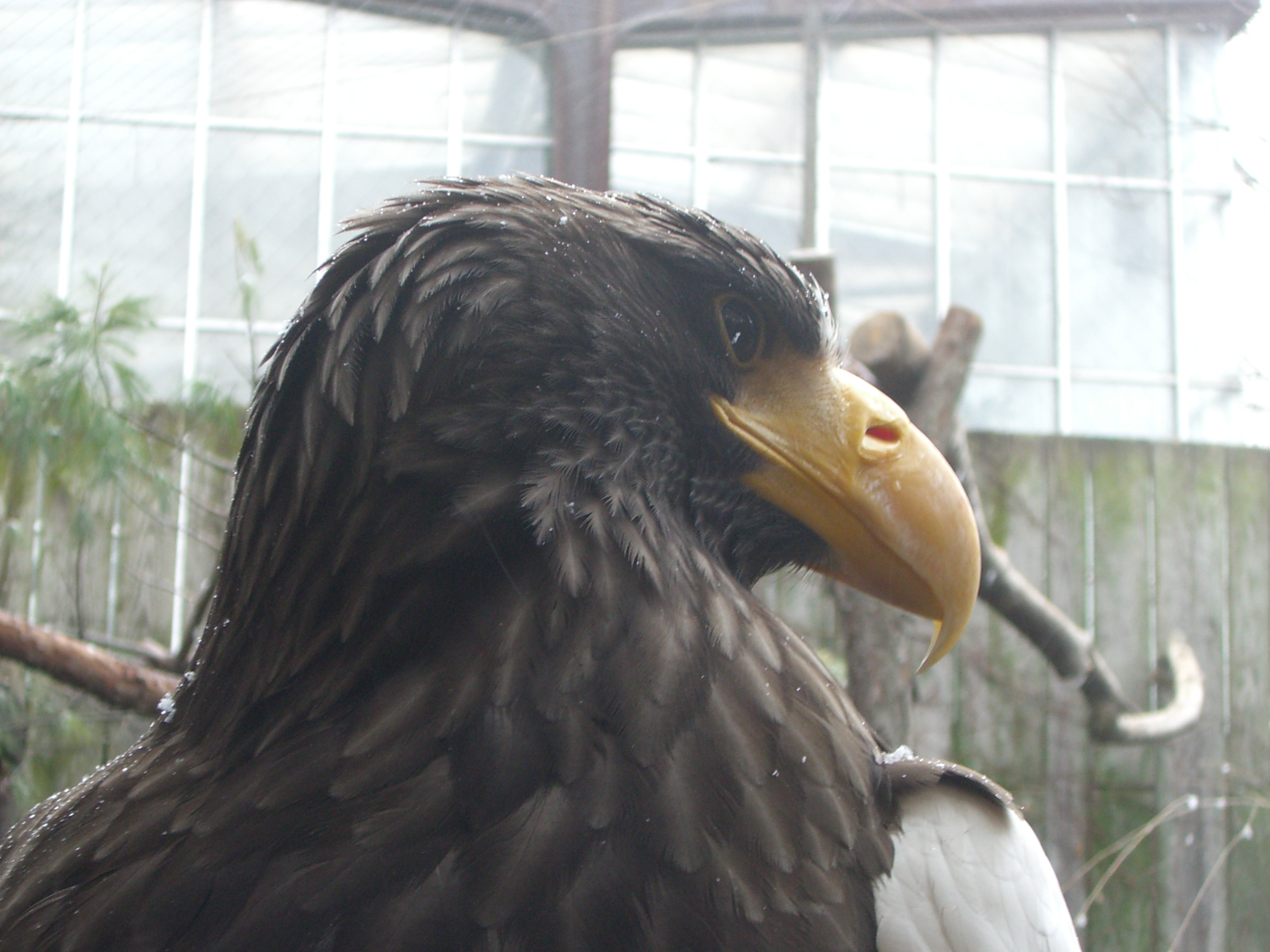
Steller's sea eagle.

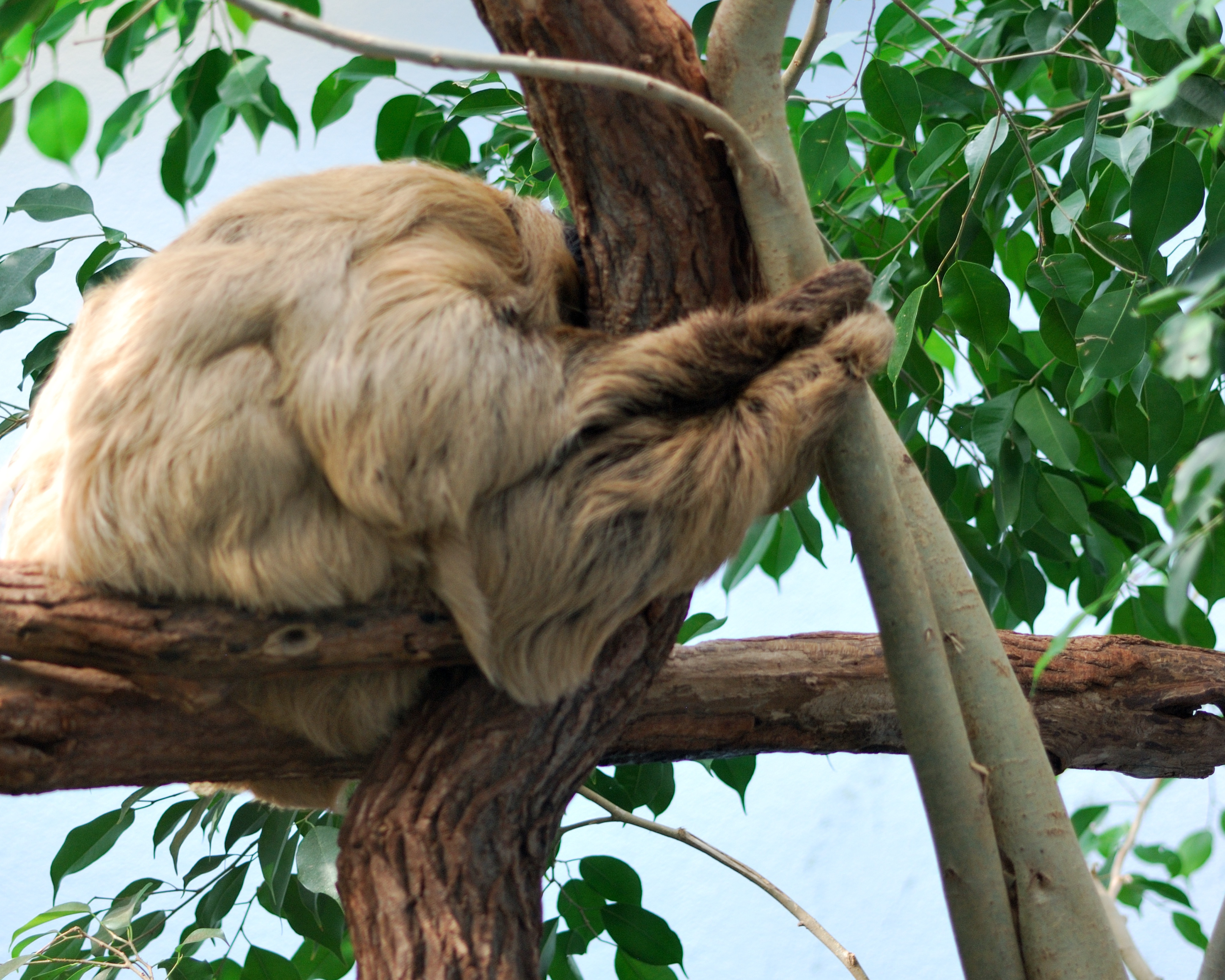
A sloth in a tree in the aviary.
