= McGowan Institute for Regenerative Medicine =

Medical research institute in Pittsburgh, Pennsylvania

Coordinates: 40.43162°N 79.96237°W

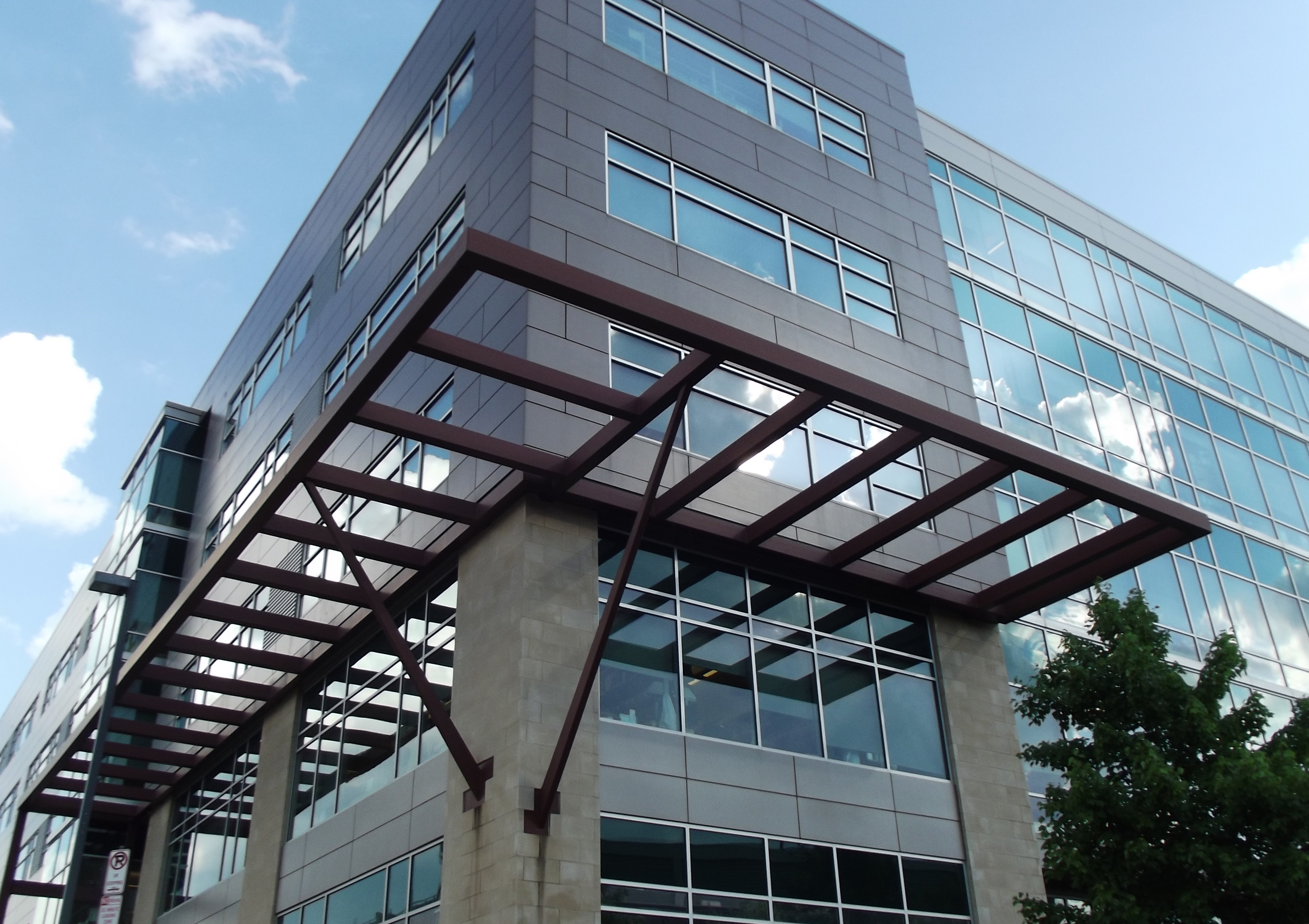
McGowan Institute Headquarters Building

McGowan Institute for Regenerative Medicine is a medical research institute which is a partnership between the University of Pittsburgh and the University of Pittsburgh Medical Center and is located in Pittsburgh, Pennsylvania, United States. It is directed by Professor Chandan K Sen.

== History ==
In 1992, the McGowan Center for Artificial Organ Development was established through a gift from William G. McGowan, founder and chairman of MCI Communications. McGowan experienced a heart attack in 1986, resulting in his receiving a heart transplant in 1987, at the University of Pittsburgh Medical Center. In 1990, William and Sue Gin McGowan donated $1 million to fund a center devoted to the studying artificial organ replacement. The McGowan Center for Artificial Organ Development was established in 1992.

The McGowan Institute was formed in 2001 by consolidating the artificial organ and medical device research of the faculty affiliated with the McGowan Center with research related to tissue engineering and cell-based therapies. McGowan Institute works on tissue and organ insufficiency through tissue engineering, cell-based therapies, and medical devices and artificial organs, with an emphasis on translating the research findings of McGowan Institute affiliated faculty into clinical use.

== Current Program ==
The McGowan Institute works to address tissue and organ insufficiency through tissue engineering, cell-based therapies, and medical devices, and artificial organs, with an emphasis on translating the research findings of McGowan Institute affiliated faculty into clinical use. McGowan Institute is:

- Developing and delivering therapies that reestablish tissue and organ function;
- Creating and sharing regenerative medicine educational activities, training, and publications; and,
- Supporting and furthering the commercialization of technologies in regenerative medicine.
