= Church Music Association of America =

Non-profit church music organization

King David singing the Psalms

The Church Music Association of America (CMAA) is a nonprofit 501(c)(3) association of Catholic church musicians and others who have a special interest in music and liturgy, active in advancing Gregorian chant, Renaissance polyphony, and other forms of sacred music for liturgical use. Founded in 1964, it is affiliated with the Consociatio Internationalis Musicae Sacrae (Roma), an advisory organization on sacred music founded by Pope Paul VI.

The CMAA provides support for those interested in participating in a revival of Gregorian chant and sacred polyphony in Catholic liturgy. It sponsors scholarship and composition in the tradition of sacred music. It hosts the most-attended colloquium on sacred music in the English-speaking world, held annually since 1990.

The CMAA embraces the statement made by Pope Benedict XVI on June 25, 2006: "An authentic updating of sacred music can take place only in the lineage of the great tradition of the past, of Gregorian chant and sacred polyphony."

It publishes the biannual journal Sacred Music and serves as a professional and social network for musicians, seminarians, and priests dedicated to the aesthetic and liturgical ideals of the Catholic Church.

== History ==
=== Consociatio Internationalis Musicae Sacrae ===
The CMAA was formed as the American affiliate of the Consociatio Internationalis Musicae Sacrae (CIMS), established by Pope Paul VI on November 22, 1963, the Feast of Saint Cecilia, patroness of music. CIMS developed out of a series of conferences on sacred music held in Europe starting in the Holy Year 1950, sponsored by the Pontifical Institute of Sacred Music. The chirograph, Nobile subsidium Liturgiae, established the Consociatio as an "international institute which would be able to make known [to the Holy See] the needs of sacred music, and which would be able to assist in putting the decisions of the supreme ecclesiastical authority relating to sacred music into practice." Pope Paul VI appointed officers for the CIMS on March 7, 1964.

=== Founding ===
As the Second Vatican Council drew to a close in 1964, a group of American church musicians met at Boys' Town, Nebraska, to form the CMAA as the American affiliate of the Consociatio. They were members of the Society of Saint Gregory of America (founded 1913) and the American Society of Saint Cecilia (founded 1874). A photo taken at the meeting shows 63 participants. Most prominent at the meeting were Monsignor Schmitt, Reverend Richard J. Schuler, Archabbot Rembert Weakland, Father John Selner, and Father Robert A. Skeris. A provisional constitution was drafted and officers were chosen: Weakland was named president, Father Cletus Madsen vice president, Father Schuler secretary, and Frank Szynskie treasurer. At this meeting a resolution put forward by Fr. Skeris was adopted in which the group pledged itself to maintain the highest artistic standards in church music and to preserve the treasury of sacred music, especially Gregorian chant.

In 1966, the Consociatio sponsored a convention in Milwaukee, Wisconsin in conjunction with the Fifth International Church Music Congress. At its conclusion, delegates held the first general meeting of the CMAA.

According to an account by Richard Schuler, a split emerged very quickly, with President Weakland taking sharp exception to the "negative and restrictive" attitudes in liturgical thinking that he said were present at the Consociatio meeting. He gave interviews to the press in which he regretted the failure of the meetings to include modern music and dancing in its liturgical agenda. His views did not prevail within the CMAA: an election of new officers was held at this meeting, and Weakland was replaced as president by Theodore Marier.

=== 1968–1974 ===
In 1968, Marier was reelected, along with Noël Goemanne as vice-president, and Fr. Skeris as secretary. In 1970, Roger Wagner became president. In 1973, Gerhard Track was named president, Fr. Skeris vice president, and Monsignor Schuler secretary. At the meeting of 1973, Solemn Mass was celebrated in the Church of St. Agnes, Saint Paul, Minnesota, by Msgr. Johannes Overath with a congregation of one thousand, including Archbishop Leo Binz of Saint Paul and Bishop Alphonse Schladweiler of New Ulm, Minnesota.

Because CMAA was founded in a merger of the Society of Saint Gregory and the Society of St. Cecilia, the CMAA recognizes 1874 as the year of its founding. To recognize the hundredth anniversary of the CMAA, the organization held a Mass at the Church of St. Agnes on December 27, 1973. A congratulatory telegram from Pope Paul VI was read at the conclusion of the Mass.

Msgr. Richard Schuler was elected president in 1977; Fr. Robert Skeris succeeded Msgr. Schuler in 1998, and William Mahrt was elected in 2005. The current president, Fr. Robert Pasley, was elected in 2025 following the death of William Mahrt.

=== Since 2000 ===
CMAA president William Mahrt participated in the October 9, 2006, public comment session of the United States Conference of Catholic Bishops Liturgy Committee, Subcommittee on Music, in preparation for a revision of the 1983 document Music in Catholic Worship, which eventually produced the document Sing to the Lord.

The CMAA's annual Sacred Music Colloquium draws between 150 and 200 participants yearly, welcoming both novices and seasoned professionals to attend chant and polyphonic rehearsals which prepare participants to sing daily liturgies, as well as to attend breakout sessions on the organ, composition, conducting, and other related topics. The CMAA's journal, Sacred Music, the longest continuously published journal on music in North America, has recently added a peer-reviewed section, and each volume features scholarly and practical articles, as well as new performing editions of sacred music. The CMAA's publishing arm publishes books of scholarly and practical interest. Recent activities include the publication of several important collections of sacred music, including the Parish Book of Chant, the Parish Book of Motets, and the Parish Book of Motets for Three Voices. Each publication is supported by a website which gives away the scores, piano reductions, practice recordings, and texts and translations using a Creative Commons license. There are multiple events offered each year that are open to members, and the CMAA's Forum features thousands of threads which discuss practical and scholarly questions about Catholic sacred music. The current President of the CMAA is Fr. Robert Pasley, the Vice President is Dr. Jennifer Donelson-Nowicka, the Secretary is Janet Gorbitz, and the Treasurer is Steven Holc. Members of the board of directors are Christopher Berry, Charles Cole, Rev. Michael Connolly, Matthew Fong, David J. Hughes, Dr. Nathan Knutson, Dr. Susan Treacy, and Dr. Charles Weaver (editor, Sacred Music).

== Publishing ==
=== Sacred Music journal ===
The CMAA's quarterly journal Sacred Music is the oldest continuously published journal of music in North America. Its contributors have included Peter Phillips, founder and director of the Tallis Scholars, as well as Laszlo Dobszay, Peter A. Kwasniewski, Charles Weaver, Aaron James, Jennifer Donelson-Nowicka, Shawn Tribe, William Mahrt, and Robert Skeris. It publishes feature articles on music, commentaries on chant and polyphony, documents and reviews, news and editorials.

Sacred Music is the successor to The Catholic Choirmaster and Caecilia. Archabbot Rembert Weakland was its editor at the time of the merging. In 1966, Father March was chosen as editor. In 1975, Monsignor Schuler became editor, who described the journal as "the life-blood of our society. It is the activity that can most securely bind together the members spread across the nation. It is a means of education, encouragement, and communication. In it the pledges of the society can be fulfilled. ... It can be a record of the work of those who wish to fulfill the decrees of the Church carefully and conscientiously. It will be a record for history that a sincere effort was made in this country to implement the sixth chapter of the Constitution on the Sacred Liturgy and the instructions that followed it."

Archives of Sacred Music since 1965 are available online.

=== Internet ===
CMAA is dedicated to the ideal of making the liturgical heritage of the Church, musical and textual, freely and universally available. To that end, it uses multiple means to disseminate both authoritative information and instruction, as well as actual music, in print, electronic and aural forms.

The CMAA makes new editions of traditional chant works available for free download from its website, sometimes with fuller notation than in the standard 1974 Graduale Romanum and 1962 Liber Usualis books, for the convenience of singers. In addition, the CMAA offers the full Graduale Romanum of 1961 and numerous other editions of liturgical music in Latin and the vernacular for free download.

== Summer Colloquium ==
The CMAA began sponsoring an annual Sacred Music Colloquium in 1990, in conjunction with the Ward Center of the Rome School of Music at Catholic University of America.

The colloquium offers practical instruction in the liturgical practice of Gregorian chant and polyphony. Faculty have included CMAA leaders Mahrt, Buchholz, and Skeris, and conductors Wilko Brouwers, Jennifer Donelson-Nowicka, Arlene Oost-Zinner, David Hughes, Gisbert Brandt, Horst Buchholz, Christopher Berry, and Alfred Calabrese. Guest lecturers, teachers and recitalists have included Langlais scholar Ann Labounsky, Ward Method instructor Amy Zuberbueler, Fr. Frank Phillips, C.R.. founder of the Canons Regular of St. John Cantius, vocal pedagogist MeeAe Cecilia Nam, Fr. Scott Haynes, S.J.C., Rev. Jeffrey Keyes, chant scholar Edward Schaefer, and organist Sam Backman.

In order to promote works of modern sacred music as well as chant and polyphony, the CMAA sponsors new music reading sessions at its colloquia, presenting new works of contemporary composers, including Kevin Allen and Richard Rice.

In the 1990s, CMAA's meetings and colloquia on sacred music were held at Christendom College in Front Royal, Virginia, with music professor Kurt Poterack, then editor of Sacred Music, serving as director. At the initial gatherings, Colloquium choirs traveled to the National Shrine of the Immaculate Conception to sing at a liturgy.

Beginning in 2003, the location was Catholic University of America, and the four-day program included sung Mass daily at the neighboring National Shrine.

In 2008 the program expanded to 250 participants and to six days, relocating to Chicago's Loyola University. Daily Masses, in English or Latin, including the traditional and modern forms of the Roman Rite, were sung at the Madonna della Strada Chapel, as well as Solemn Vespers, and Holy Hours with Exposition and Benediction.

In 2010 and 2011 the seven-day Summer Colloquium was held at Pittsburgh's Duquesne University. Programs included expanded lecture series, sessions for organists, and a full orchestral Mass. The 2012 and 2013 colloquia were held in Salt Lake City, Utah, at the Cathedral of the Madeleine and the neighboring Madeleine Choir School. During the 2013 event, Archbishop Alexander King Sample presented a lecture on "The Spirit of the Liturgy", according to the thought of Pope Benedict XVI. The Colloquium has since been held at major churches and cathedrals in Indianapolis, St. Louis, St. Paul (MN), Chicago, and Philadelphia.

The breadth of faculty and speakers at the Colloquium continues to expand, with scholars, artists and clergy including the Most Rev. Andrew Cozzens, bishop of the Diocese of Crookston; organ virtuoso and Director of Music, Liturgy & Sacred Arts at the Chapel of Saint Thomas Aquinas at the University of Saint Thomas Dr. Jacob Benda; and Fr. Mark Bachmann, O.S.B. choirmaster of Clear Creek Abbey, a monastery of the Solesmes Congregation in Oklahoma.

Audio and video recordings of the liturgical and musical offerings of Colloquium liturgies, lectures and addresses are available and widely disseminated on the internet.

== Officers ==
As of 2025, with the death of former president, Professor William Mahrt, musicologist and director of the Stanford Early Music Singers, director of the St. Ann Choir at St. Thomas Aquinas Church in Palo Alto, California, and editor of Sacred Music., Rev. Robert Pasley, the organization's long-time chaplain, and rector of Mater Ecclesiae Roman Catholic Church in Berlin, New Jersey is the CMAA's president. Its former vice president, Horst Buchholz, onetime Director of Music at the Cathedral Basilica in St. Louis, Missouri and Conductor Laureate of the Denver Philharmonic Orchestra., and more recently music director of the Cathedral of the Most Blessed Sacrament, in Detroit, Michigan has been succeeded by Dr. Jennifer Donelson-Nowicka, Associate Professor and the Director of Sacred Music at St. Patrick’s Seminary, Menlo Park, California. She is also director of Catholic Institute of Sacred Music, and serves as a consultant to the USCCB’s Committee on Divine Worship.
