= St. Paul Church (Cambridge, Massachusetts) =

Catholic church in Massachusetts, US

St. Paul Church, Harvard Square
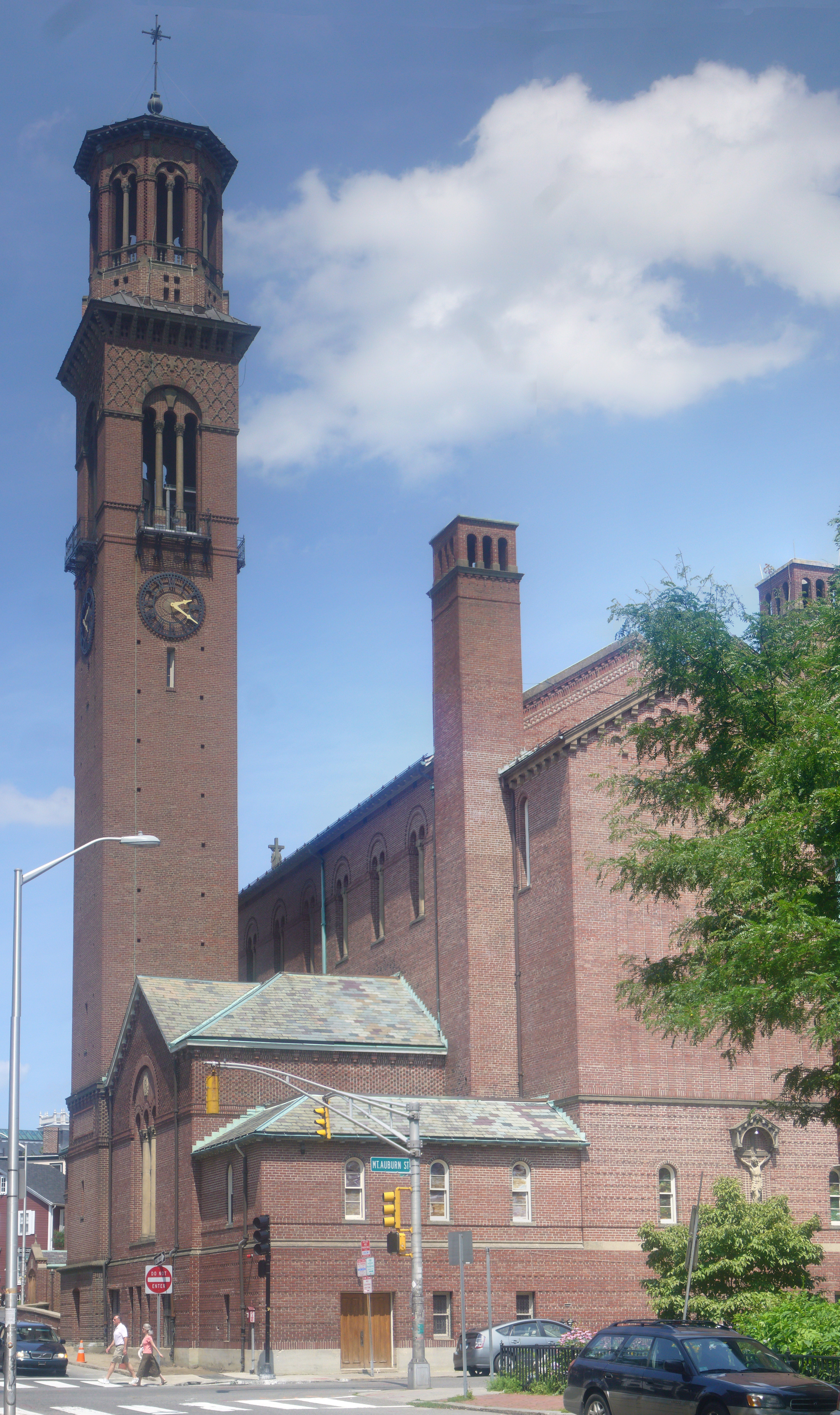
- St. Paul Church from the southwest at the intersection of Mount Auburn and DeWolfe Streets
- St. Paul Church, Harvard Square
- 42.3712°N 71.1156°W
- Location: 29 Mount Auburn St; Cambridge, Massachusetts
- Country: United States
- Denomination: Catholic Church
- Sui iuris church: Latin Church
- Website: www.stpaulsharvardsquare.org

History
- Status: Parish church
- Dedicated: October 13, 1924 (by Cardinal O'Connell)

Architecture
- Functional status: Active
- Architect: Edward T. P. Graham

Specifications
- Materials: Brick

Administration
- Archdiocese: Boston
- Parish: St. Paul

Clergy
- Pastor(s): Rev. William T. Kelly, S.T.D.

St. Paul Church is a Catholic church of the Archdiocese of Boston located at 29 Mount Auburn Street near Harvard Square in Cambridge, Massachusetts, United States. As well as serving as the local parish church, it is the home of St. Paul's Choir School whose students serve as the choristers in the Choir of St. Paul's, and the Harvard Catholic Center serving the academic community of Harvard University.

The church was built from 1916 to 1924 and was designed by Edward T. P. Graham in the Italian Romanesque style. It is part of the Harvard Square Historic District.

== History ==
The Church of St. Paul was one of many parishes in the area founded by Fr. Manasses Dougherty largely in response to the influx of Irish Catholics to the Boston area in the late 19th century. The original St. Paul's Church building, a former meeting house of the Shepherd Congregational Society on the site of what is now Harvard University's Holyoke Center, was purchased by Fr. Dougherty in 1873. The cornerstone for the present church building, an Italian Romanesque monument located at Quincy Square (corner of Bow and Arrow Streets), was laid in November 1916 under the leadership of then-pastor Rev. John J. Ryan.

The architect was Edward T. P. Graham, a St. Paul's parishioner, graduate of Harvard University, and winner of the first Traveling Fellowship to Rome and the École des Beaux-Arts. Graham used Verona's Basilica of San Zeno Maggiore and Torre del Commune as inspirations. The new church building, which was dedicated in October 1924, was at the same site as the St. Paul's School, which had been built some years before. By the mid-1960s, enrollment had declined and the parish school was replaced by the Choir School. In 1991, under the direction of then-pastor Rev. John P. Boles (later Auxiliary Bishop of Boston), the original school building was torn down and replaced with a multi-purpose building attached to the church, which houses the rectory, parish offices, the Choir School and the Harvard Catholic Center. The present pastor of St. Paul's and Senior Catholic Chaplain to Harvard is the Reverend William T. Kelly, who has served as pastor since June 2016.

== Organ ==
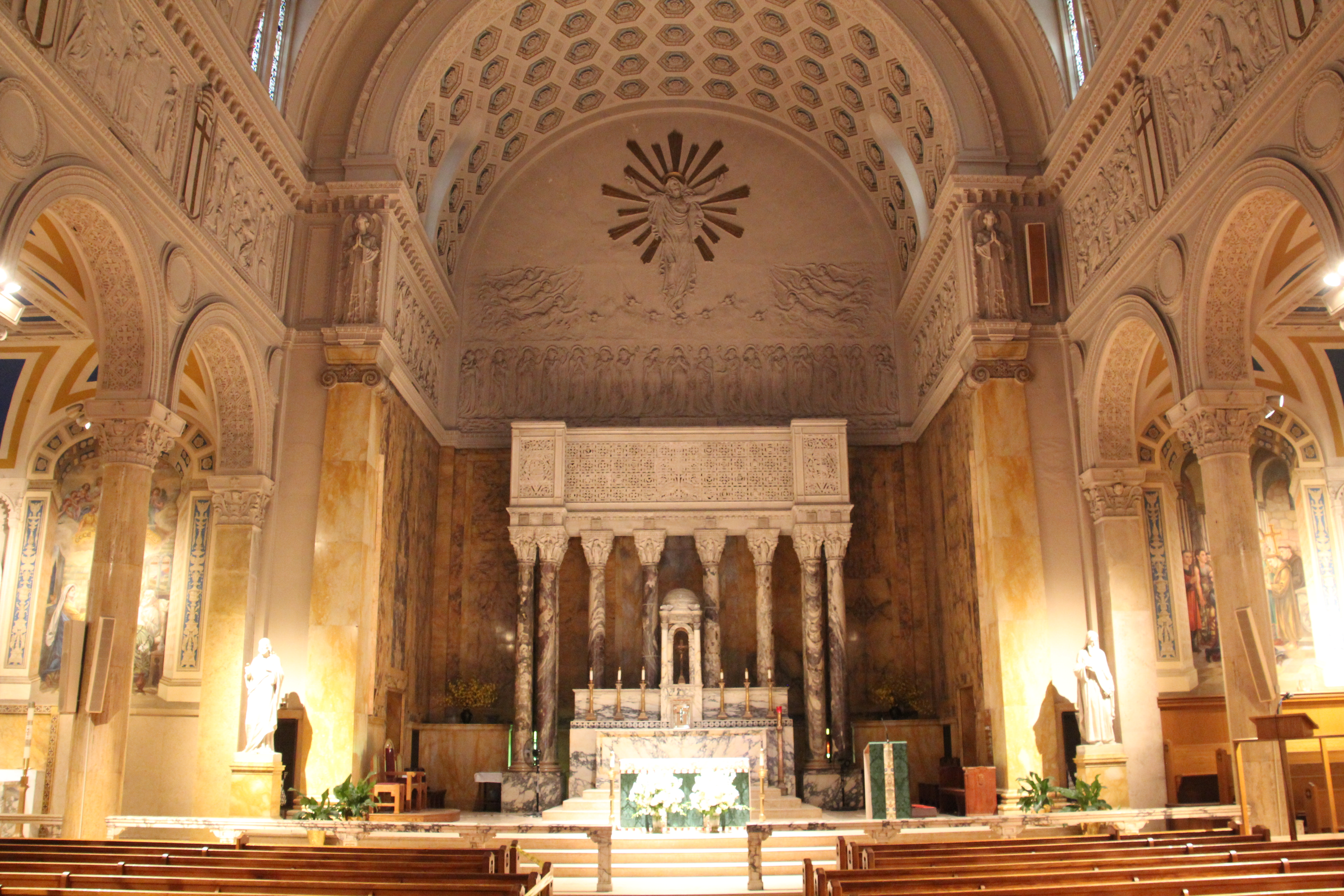
View from the nave looking toward the high altar

An organ of 35 stops was built for the original church building in 1904 by Jesse Woodberry & Co (Opus 251), designed by Edward MacGoldrick. The organ was enlarged to 50 stops and relocated to the gallery of the present building between 1923 and 1924 by Emil Mias. Mias died before the organ's completion, so his son, Paul F.C. Mias finished the organ. Casavant Frères built in 1947 a new console for the Woodberry/Mias organ, which was their Op. 1893. In 1959, Casavant annexed a Chancel organ (Op. 1893, 2560A) of 19 ranks, in the 'neo-baroque' style in the south transept to the Woodberry/Mias gallery organ. The gallery organ underwent significant tonal alterations in 1971 under the direction of Arthur Birchall, former vice-president of Aeolian-Skinner. A new “console" was completed in 1999 by Robert M. Turner, and numerous electronic "voices" were synthesized by Walker Technical Company.

In 2015 plans were finalized to return the console to its original position in the organ gallery, and the digital voices were all removed, along with the neo-baroque pipework. An 1855 chamber organ was also erected in the South transept for use when the choir sings in that location.

== Music staff ==
=== Directors of music ===
- 1878–1889 Louisa T. Quigley
- 1890–1891 Nellie Doherty (interim)
- 1891–1892 Christian Thelen (interim)
- 1892–1904 Henry T. Carty
- 1904–1909 Edward J. MacGoldrick (credited with founding the boys choir)
- 1909–1938 George G. McConnell
- 1938–1947 Joseph Ecker
- 1947–1986 Theodore Marier (founder of St. Paul's Choir School with Monsignor Augustine Hickey)
- 1986–2008 John G. Dunn
- 2008–2009 Jennifer A. Lester
- 2009–2010 John G. Dunn
- 2010–2019 John Robinson (later Director of Music at Blackburn Cathedral)
- 2019–2023 James Kennerley
- 2023–2024 Richard Webster (Interim Director of Music)
- 2024–present Brandon Straub

=== Assistant directors of music ===
- 1934–1947 Theodore Marier
- 1963–1966 Paul J. Hotin
- 1966–1986 John G. Dunn
- 1986–1988 Sister Catherina Kim
- 1988–1992 Timothy Hughes
- 1992–1999 Joseph Policelli
- 1999–2008 Jennifer Lester
- 2008–2009 Louis Perazza
- 2009–2011 Jennifer A. Lester
- 2011–2016 Jonathan Wessler (later Cantor of First Lutheran Church, Boston)
- 2016–2019 Jeremy Bruns (later Associate Organist and Choirmaster at the Church of the Advent)
- 2019–2022 Maks Adach (later Assistant Organist at Saint Thomas Church Fifth Avenue, New York City.)
- 2022–2023 Owen Reid (later Associate Director of Music & Organist at the Church of the Incarnation, Dallas, TX.)
- 2023–2024 Brandon Straub
- 2024–present Nara Lee

=== Organ scholars ===
- 1960–1966(?) John G. Dunn
- 1997(?) - 2011 James Swist
- 2011–2014 Alexander Pattavina (later Director of Music of St Agnes' Church, NYC)
- 2014–2018 Forrest Eimold
- 2017–2018 Blake Chen, Junior Organ Scholar
- 2018–2021 Blake Chen, Senior Organ Scholar
- 2019–2021 Colin Lapus, Junior Organ Scholar
- 2021–2024 Michael Thekaekara

== Chapel of Women Doctors of the Church ==
The Harvard College Class of 2018 gift to the Harvard Catholic Center was the beautification of the Chapel of Women Doctor of the Church at St. Paul Church (Cambridge, Massachusetts). In addition, parents of the student graduates also made targeted donations. Nelly Sfeir Gonzalez sponsored the writing of the icon of St. Teresa of Avila, which she gifted to the Chapel in honor of her grandchildren and Harvard College undergraduate students Xavier Gonzalez, class of 2018, and Natasha Gonzalez, class of 2020. Mary Jane and Glenn Creamer sponsored the writing of the icon of St. Therese of Lisieux gifted to the Chapel in honor of their daughter Margot Creamer. Mr. and Mrs. Kevin O'Meara sponsored th writing of the icon of St. Catherine of Sienna gifted to the chapel in honor of Ryan O'Meara. Mariette Murphy, M.D. sponsored the writing of the icon of St. Hildegard of Bingen gifted to the Chapel in honor of Marisa Murphy O'Boyle PhD.

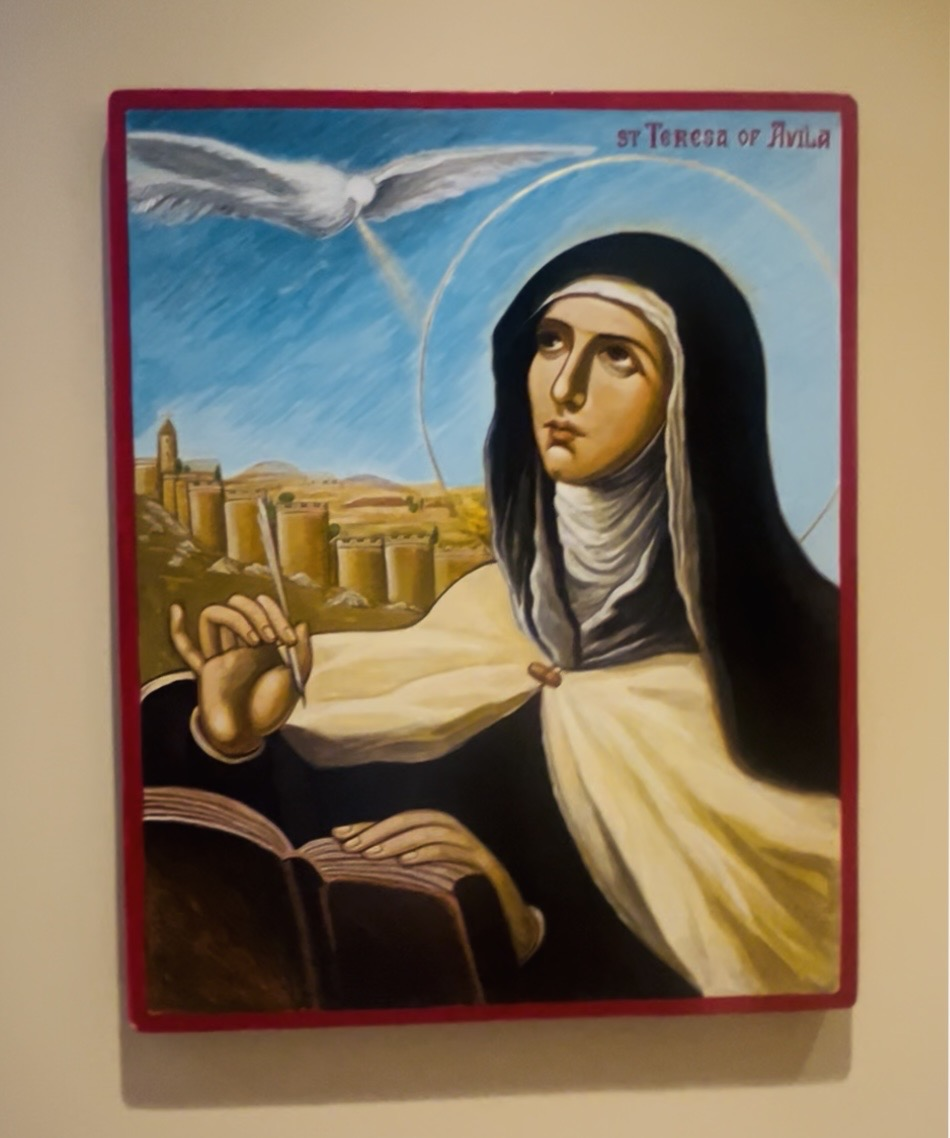
Icon of St. Teresa of Avila

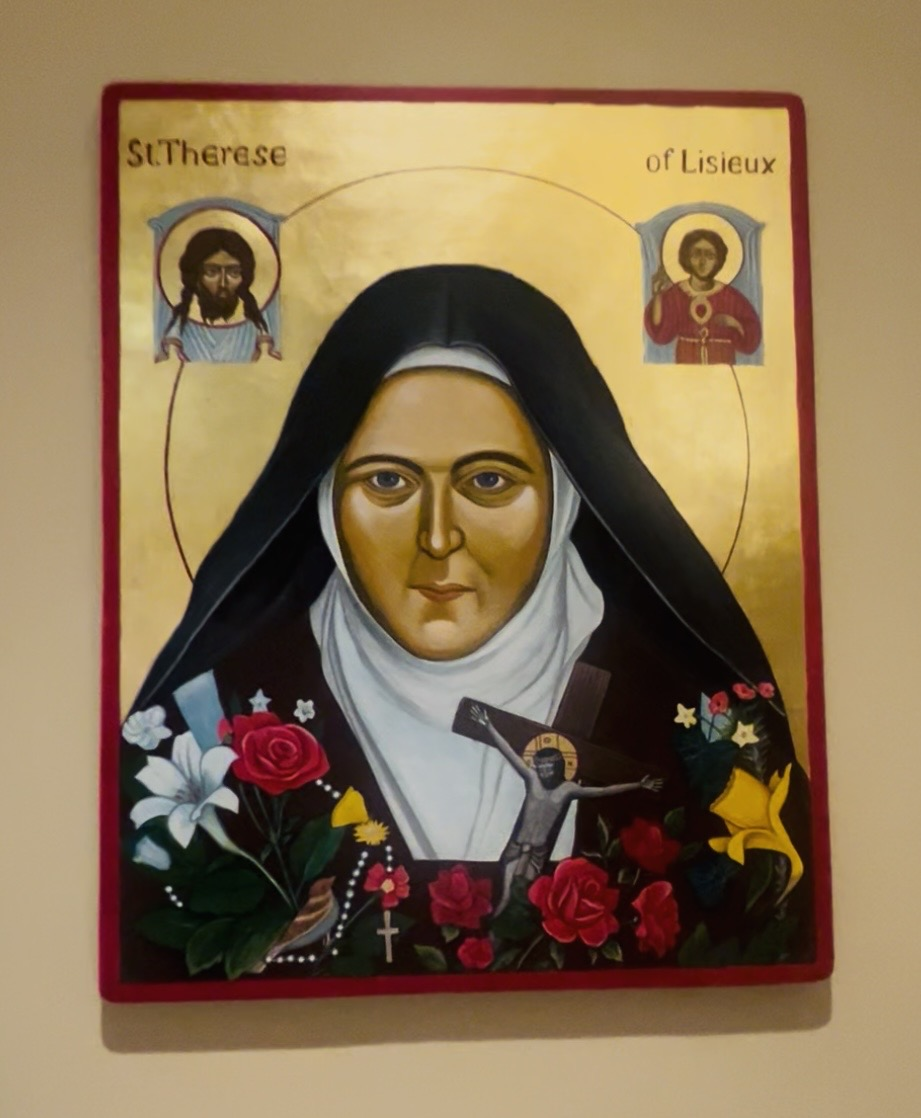
Icon of Saint Therese of Lisieux at Chapel of Women Doctors of the Church Harvard Catholic Center

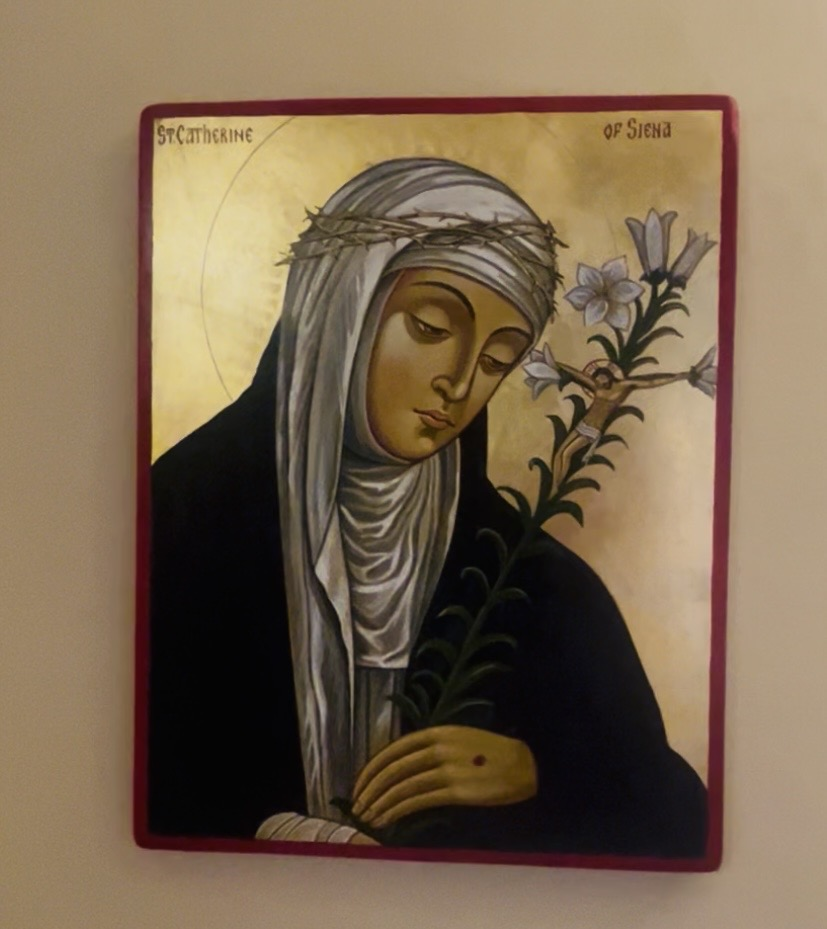
Icon of Saint Catherine of Sienna at Chapel of Women Doctors of the Church Harvard Catholic Center

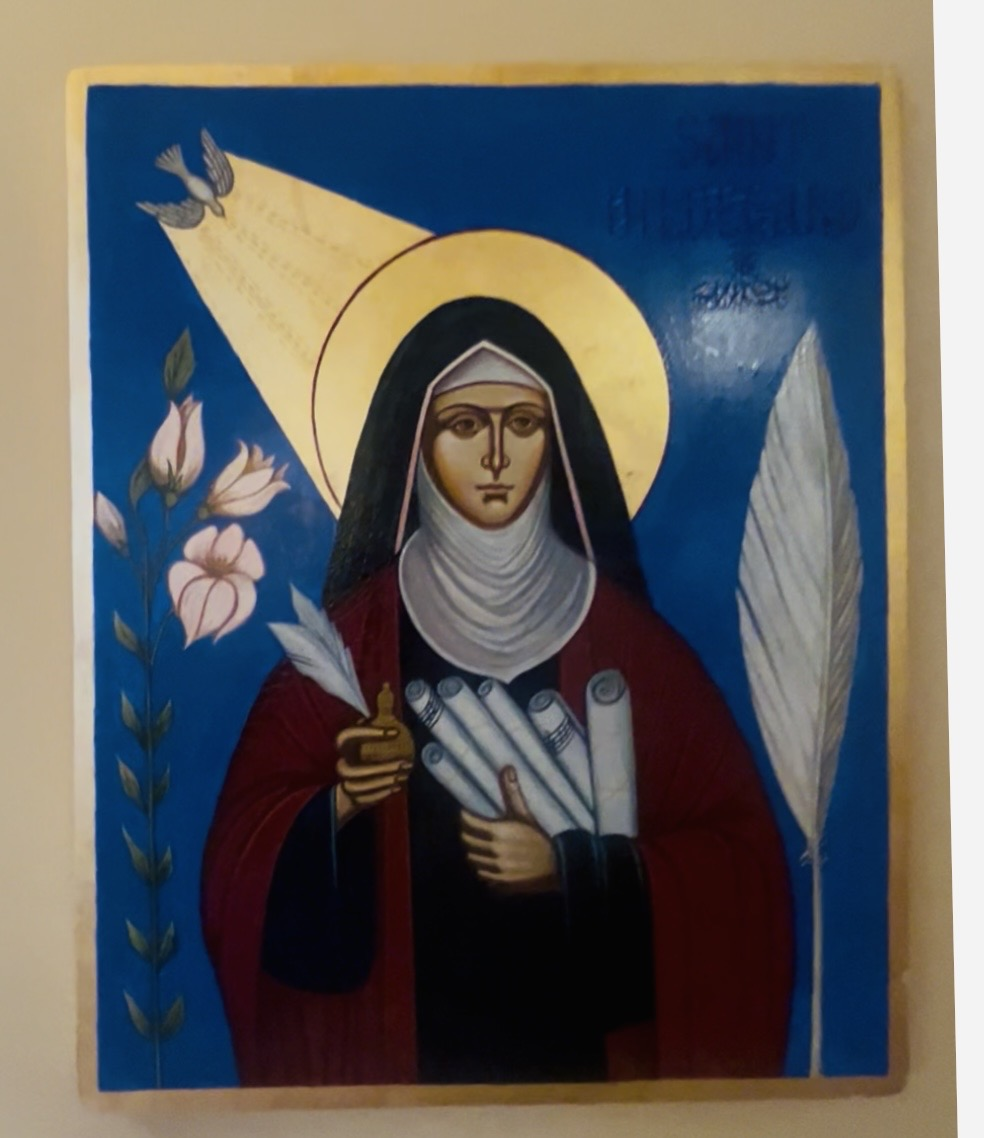
Saint Hildegard of Bingen at Chapel of Women Doctors of the Church Harvard Catholic Center
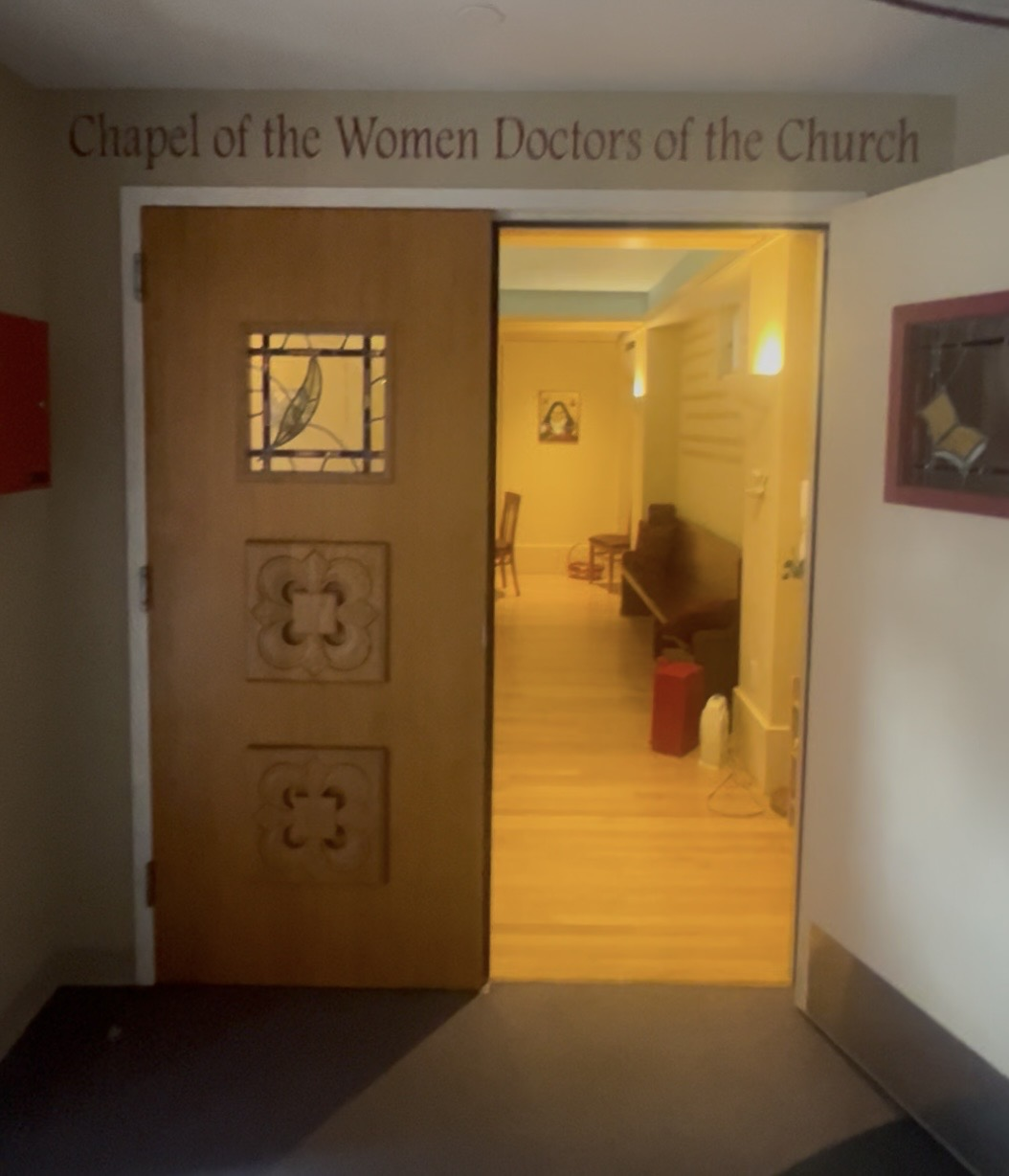
Entrance to the Chapel of the Women Doctors of the Church

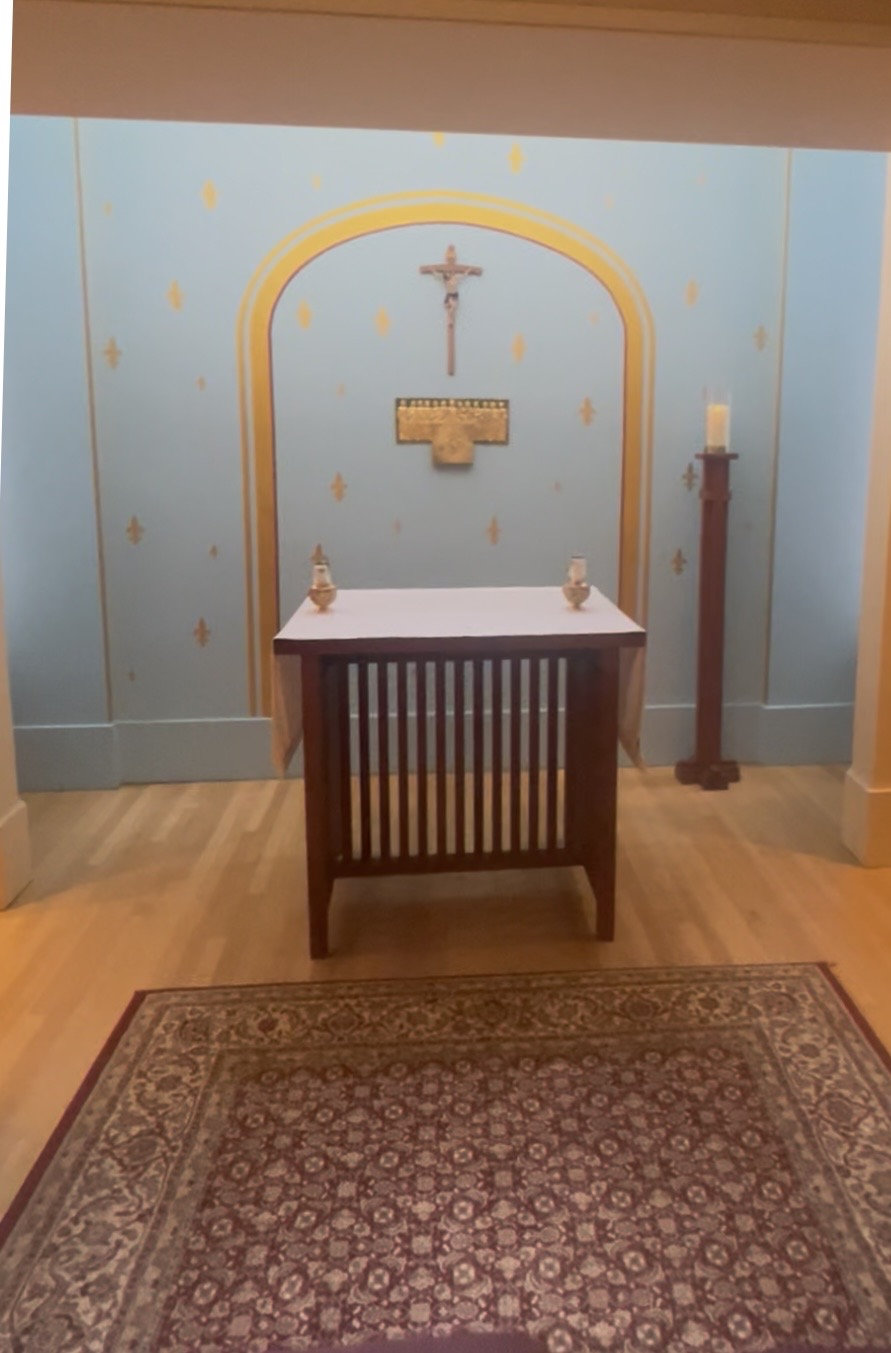
Altar of the Chapel of Women Doctors of the Church

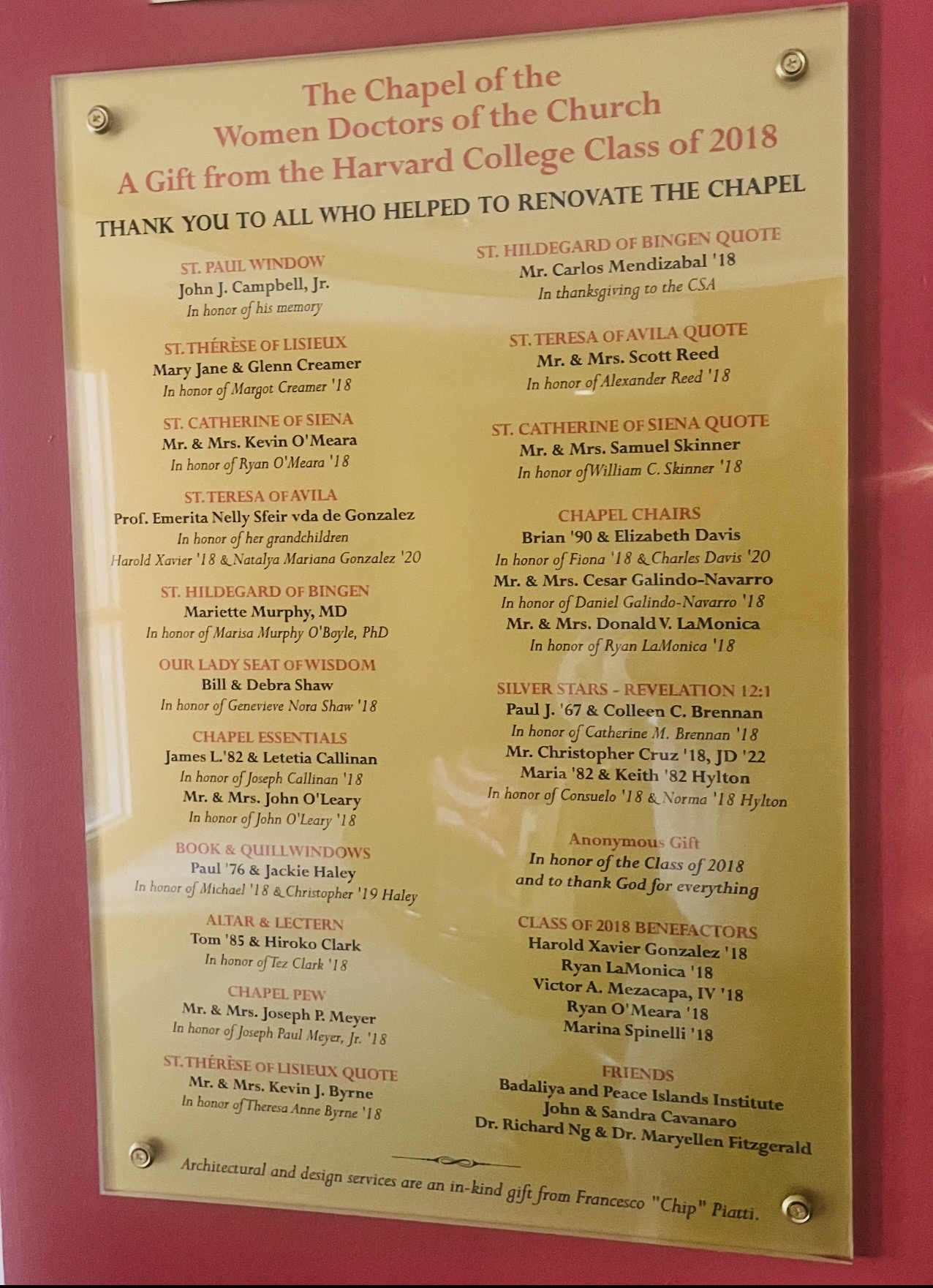
Plaque of benefactors of the Chapel of Women Doctors of the Church
