= McNeice =

McNeice is a surname. Notable people with the surname include:

- Erin McNeice (born 2004), English rock climber
- Ian McNeice (born 1950), English actor
- John A. McNeice Jr (born 1940), American philanthropist
- Roger McNeice, Australian numismatist, historian and coin collector
- Vince McNeice (1938–2022), English footballer and manager

== See also ==
- Jake McNiece (1919–2013), US Army paratrooper in World War II
- John MacNeice (1866–1942), Church of Ireland bishop, father of the poet Louis
- Louis MacNeice (1907–1963), poet and playwright, born in Northern Ireland
