= Scott Turkington =

Scott Turkington is the organist and choirmaster at the Shrine of Our Lady of Guadalupe. A native of Minneapolis, he studied music at the University of Minnesota, the Boston Conservatory of Music and The Catholic University of America, his former teachers including Richard Waggoner, Heinrich Fleischer, Phillip Steinhaus, and George Faxon.

Before that, he served at Holy Family Catholic Church in St. Louis Park, Minnesota. Until 2014, he served as organist and choirmaster for the Roman Catholic Cathedral of Saint John the Baptist in Charleston, South Carolina, and before his service there, was organist and choirmaster for the Roman Catholic Basilica of Saint John the Evangelist in Stamford, Connecticut, conducting a professional choir in a program of weekly polyphonic Mass settings and Gregorian chant until 2010. Before accepting the position at St. John's in 1998, he was Assistant Organist and Conductor at the National Shrine of the Immaculate Conception in Washington, D.C. While at the National Shrine, he played for over 500 services each year, and appeared on live national television dozens of times. He has been Music Director at the Church of the Covenant in Boston; Music Teacher and Organist at St. Paul's Choir School in Harvard Square, under Theodore Marier.

Before his retirement from the Church Music Association of America in 2018, he conducted many choirs, gave seminars on Gregorian chant, and annual summer courses for the CMAA.

As an organ recitalist, he has played innumerable U.S. recitals, having made his New York debut at St. Patrick’s Cathedral, and in Washington, D.C., at the Washington National Cathedral. As a conductor of Early Music, he has performed throughout the U.S., including New York’s Morgan Library. He has performed for a national convention of the Organ Historical Society, and is a featured performer on the Organ Historical Society compact disc, Organs of Baltimore. In 1994, his choir performed for Pope John Paul II at St. Peter's Basilica in Rome.

As lecturer, he has given talks on Catholic Church Music for many U.S. Catholic dioceses, as well as for St. Thomas, Fifth Avenue’s Choirmasters' Conference, under John Scott.

He is editor of A Gregorian Chant Masterclass by Theodore Marier, published by the Abbey of Regina Laudis in Bethlehem, Connecticut. This book and its companion CD feature the Stamford Schola Gregoriana and the nuns of Regina Laudis, both conducted by Turkington.
