= Boston College High School =

Private school in Massachusetts, US

Boston College
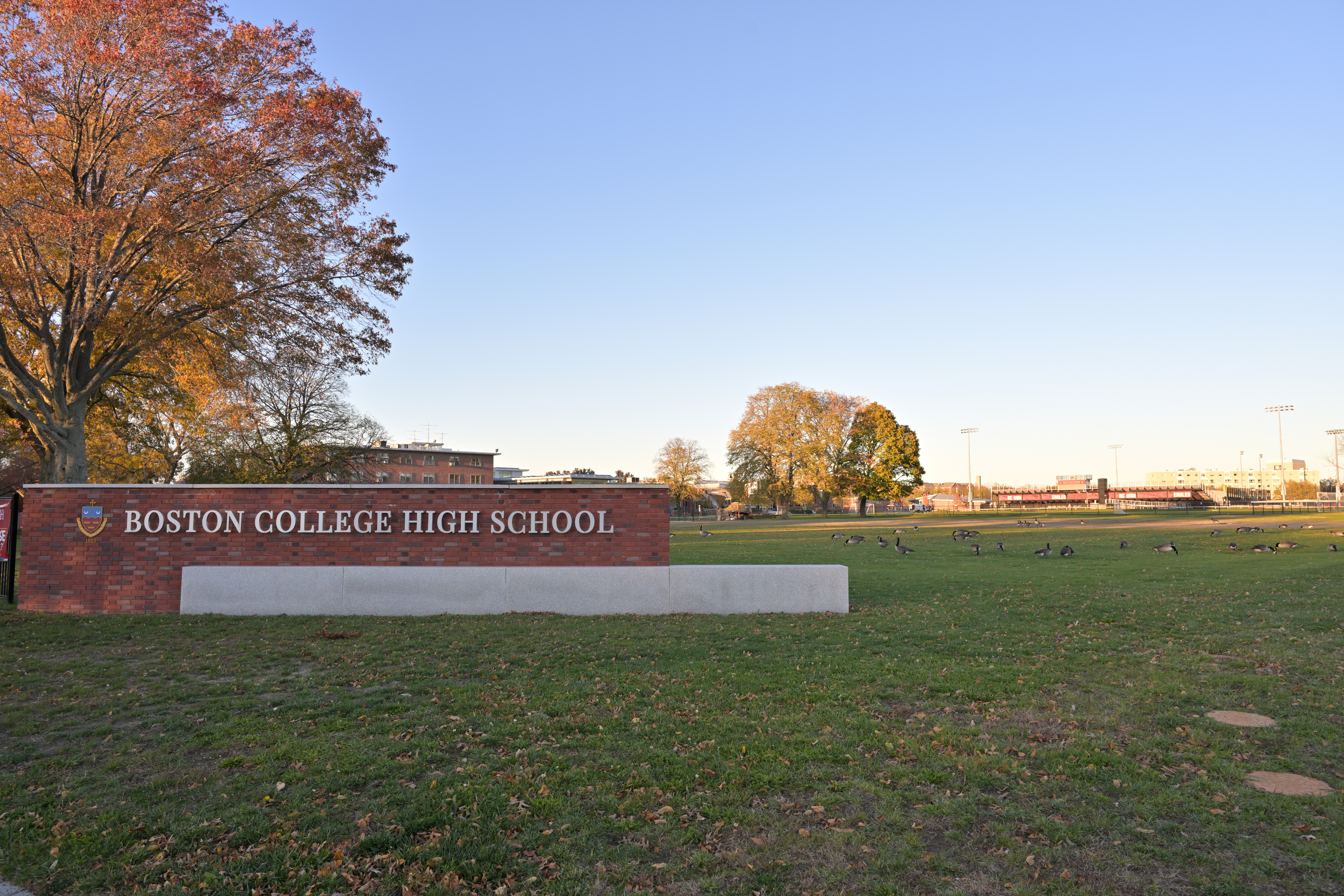

Location
- 150 Morrissey Boulevard; Boston, Massachusetts 02125; United States; 42°18′58″N 71°2′47″W

Information
- Type: Private, all-boys, college-preparatory
- Motto: Latin: Ut Cognoscant Te (So they may know You.)
- Religious affiliation: Roman Catholic (Jesuit)
- Established: March 31, 1863 (as part of Boston College); March 29, 1927 (as separate institution)
- Founder: John McElroy
- Oversight: Archdiocese of Boston
- CEEB code: 220180
- NCES School ID: 00600981
- President: Grace Cotter Regan
- Principal: Anthony Docanto
- Grades: 7–12
- Enrollment: 1,397
- Colors: Maroon and gold
- Fight song: "For Boston"
- Athletics: MIAA Division 1
- Athletics conference: Catholic Conference
- Nickname: Eagles
- Rivals: Catholic Memorial; St. John's Prep; Xaverian
- Accreditation: NEASC
- Publication: The Botolphian (literary magazine)
- Newspaper: The Eagle
- Endowment: $104 million (FY2025)
- Website: bchigh.edu

Boston College High School (also known as BC High) is an all-male, Jesuit, Catholic college-preparatory day school in the Columbia Point neighborhood of Dorchester, Boston, Massachusetts. It educates approximately 1,400 students in grades 7–12. Founded in 1863 as a constituent part of Boston College, the school separated from the college in 1927.

== History ==
=== Foundation and relationship with Boston College ===
In 1863, Jesuit priest John McElroy founded Boston College as a seven-year educational institution combining high school and college. The school administration believed that a seven-year course of study would ensure "moral influence" and a "uniform and homogeneous course of teaching and of training." The high school and college shared a campus in Boston's South End until 1910 (when the college moved to Chestnut Hill), and legally separated in 1927. Following the split, BC High initially remained in the South End, but moved to its current Dorchester campus in 1950.

During their years as a merged institution, BC High was much larger than the college. In 1913, it enrolled 1,300 students to the college's 300. In 1922, BC High enrolled 1,500 boys, making it the nation's largest Catholic high school and by far the nation's largest Catholic boys' school (the next largest, in Philadelphia, educated 859). Students who graduated from BC High in good standing were automatically admitted to Boston College without examination. Today, only a minority of BC High students (102 out of 1445 graduates between 2017 and 2021) attend Boston College.

Although BC High and Boston College are now separate institutions, the two schools' athletic programs share the Eagle mascot, and graduates of BC High and BC are known as "Double Eagles." (Graduates of BC High, BC, and BC's graduate schools (traditionally the law school) are called "Triple Eagles.")

Due to its shared history with Boston College, BC High has always been open to students of all faiths. The original Boston College was founded "to educate Boston's predominantly Irish, Catholic immigrant community." Nonetheless, the state government required the founders to open the school to students of all religious backgrounds, as reflected in Boston College's founding charter.

=== 21st-century developments ===
In the 21st century, the size of BC High's student body has fluctuated for various reasons. For most of the 2000s, the school educated approximately 1,300 students in the high school division. In 2006, BC High added a middle school (grades 7–8), dubbed the "Arrupe Division," which temporarily increased the size of the school to 1,600 students. Since 2015, the student body has been shrinking. That year, the school surveyed its parents and alumni, who generally supported decreasing the size of the school over the alternatives of admitting female students or raising tuition to free up endowment funds for financial aid. In the 2022–23 school year, BC High enrolled 1,405 students, 334 of whom were in the middle school.

The school reportedly considered admitting girls in 2015 and 2017, but declined to do so after opposition from several stakeholders, including (allegedly) Cardinal O'Malley, the Archbishop of Boston, who was reportedly concerned about the effect a co-ed BC High might have on the Archdiocese's all-girls schools. A former chairman of the BC High board of trustees echoed this concern. However, in 2017 BC High appointed its first female president, Grace Cotter Regan, who stated that she would respect the board and alumni's wishes to continue single-sex education.

In 2023, BC High announced that it was launching a $125 million fundraising campaign to expand the scholarship fund and upgrade the campus. This campaign includes a $49 million gift (the largest in school history) to build a wellness complex, which will include a strength and conditioning center, a swimming pool, and exercise machines.

=== Sexual misconduct accusations ===
In 2002, Stephen F. Dawber was suspended from his teaching duties after accusations of sexual assault. This came just days after two other priests were accused of abuse about a decade prior.

In 2005, Jesuit priest James Talbot, who was also a teacher and coach at the school, pleaded guilty to rape, assault with intent to rape, and three counts of assault and battery, related to two students he sexually abused during his time there. The school had previously removed him after allegations of sexual assault surfaced from his time at Cheverus High School in Portland, Maine. Talbot's actions were subsequently dramatized in the 2015 film Spotlight. In 2016, BC High trustee Jack Dunn successfully threatened to sue Spotlight's filmmakers for defamation. The film's distributor issued a statement clarifying that Dunn had not personally covered up sexual abuse at BC High.

== Academics ==
=== Global Education ===
The Hyde Center for Global Education was founded was established in 2012 with the gift of Lawrence Hyde, who was a member of the Class of 1942. The program offers a variety of international programs to 18 different countries.

=== Innovation ===
In 2020, alumnus Jack Shields donated $5 million to establish the Shields Innovation Center. The program aims to "prioritize entrepreneurial thinking while preparing students for the rapidly evolving innovation economy".

== Financials ==
=== Tuition and financial aid ===
In the 2026-27 school year, BC High charged students $35,000, plus other mandatory and optional fees.

41% of the student body is on financial aid. Based on the school's reported $11 million financial aid budget, the average aid grant is roughly $19,000 (~70% of tuition). In 2017, approximately 50% of the student body received financial aid, but the average aid grant was less than 50% of tuition.

=== Endowment and expenses ===
BC High does not file publicly accessible Internal Revenue Service disclosures. In the 2023 fiscal year, BC High reported that its financial endowment stood at $88.9 million.

== Facilities ==
St. Ignatius Hall (formerly McElroy Hall) is the Dorchester campus' original building. Shortly after, Cushing Hall opened in 1953, followed by the new Jesuit residence, Loyola Hall, in 1957. The Walsh Hall Science Center opened in 1965. Walsh Hall was renovated in 2007 for the opening of the Arrupe Division, which serves grades 7-8. McQuillan Hall and Cadigan Hall are the two newest buildings on the campus. McQuillan Hall houses the new science center and cafeteria.

Cadigan Hall opened in 2013 after alumnus Pat Cadigan donated $12 million for a new "arts and recreation building". The hall features an atrium to facilitize alumni and outreach events. Cadigan Hall serves the art and music departments as well as the athletic program.

In the spring of 2016, Monan Park opened as the new home for the home for baseball at Boston College High School and the University of Massachusetts Boston. The complex features a baseball stadium with seating for 500 spectators and identical dimensions to Fenway Park, as well as a secondary field for baseball, lacrosse, and soccer. The joint project with the neighboring University of Massachusetts Boston was made possible with a $2 million donation from the Yawkey Foundation.

On October 18, 2025, after receiving a generous $49 million donation, the Patrick F. Cadigan '52 Family Foundation Wellness Complex opened. The 42,000 square foot facility includes a 6,200 square foot state of the art weight room, an eight lane 25m pool with both 3m and 1m diving board options, a nutrition classroom, a 3,700 square foot cardio space, as well as a 1,000 square foot athletic center.

=== Athletics ===
Boston College High School teams are known as the Eagles, a name they share with Boston College. They compete as a member of the Massachusetts Interscholastic Athletic Association (MIAA) Division 1 level, competing in the Catholic Conference (CC). As of 2021, the school offered 20 varsity sports teams. Sponsored sports include baseball, basketball, cross country, football, golf, ice hockey, lacrosse, rowing, rugby, sailing, skiing, soccer, swimming and diving, tennis, track and field, ultimate, volleyball, and wrestling.

The mascot for all Boston College High School athletic teams is the Eagle, generally referred to in the plural, i.e., "The Eagles". The school colors are maroon and gold. The fight song is For Boston.

The football team has a long-standing rivalry with Catholic Memorial School. They have faced off every year since 1962. The winner of the Thanksgiving Day game wins the Pumpkin Trophy.

The 2009 Indoor Track Relay Team won the Massachusetts State Relays. The baseball team won the State Finals in 2001, 2008 and 2009. The soccer team won the Massachusetts State Championship in 2004. The hockey team has won the Super 8 hockey tournament six times, the second-most in the tournament's history, behind only conference rival Catholic Memorial School. In 2019, the team won the championship game at the TD Garden over Pope Francis Preparatory School 2–1 in 4OT to win their second-straight title, the longest game in tournament history. The BC High Lacrosse Team has won the Division 1 South Sectional Championship 4 times in the last 5 years: 2016, 2017, 2018, and 2021 (No Season in 2020 due to the Covid-19 Pandemic). The team won the Massachusetts Division 1 State Championship over Acton-Boxborough Regional High School in 2018 by a score of 16-3.

Principal athletic facilities include Edward T. Barry Ice Rink (capacity: 1,000), McNeice Pavilion, Monan Park (500), and Viola Stadium.

== Notable alumni ==
- Paul Benedict, actor
- William Bulger (born 1934, class of 1952), politician, former President of University of Massachusetts system
- Tim Bulman, former NFL defensive lineman
- Joe Cannata, former hockey player
- Joe Callahan, former NHL defenseman
- Jim Carey (born 1974), former NHL player
- Paul Carey (born 1968), former MLB player
- General George W. Casey Jr. (born 1948, class of 1966), four-star general, Chief of Staff of the United States Army
- David Chiu, president, San Francisco Board of Supervisors
- Bob Clasby, NFL player
- Thomas Cronin, political scientist and educator
- Richard Cardinal Cushing, Archbishop of Boston
- Most Rev. John Michael D'Arcy, Bishop Emeritus of Fort Wayne-South Bend, former Auxiliary Bishop of Boston
- Terry Driscoll (born 1947), NBA professional basketball player
- Joseph F. Dunford Jr., four-star general, U.S. Marine Corps, Chairman of Joint Chiefs of Staff
- Ed Gallagher (1910-1981, class of 1928), starting pitcher in Major League Baseball who played briefly for the Boston Red Sox during the 1932 season
- Paul Guilfoyle, actor
- Ken Hackett, Ambassador to the Holy See, retired president of Catholic Relief Services
- Daniel J. Harrington, Theologian and Biblical scholar
- Alex Hassan (born 1988), MLB player for Boston Red Sox
- General Joseph P. Hoar, former Commander-in-Chief, United States Central Command
- Ike Kamp (1900-1955), former MLB player (Boston Braves)
- Thomas G. Kelley, recipient of Medal of Honor
- Edward Thaddeus Lawton, Boston-born Catholic bishop in Nigeria
- Pat Leahy, NHL hockey player
- Dennis Lehane, author of Mystic River, Gone Baby Gone, Shutter Island
- Todd Lyons, former Director of U.S. Immigration and Customs Enforcement
- Theodore Marier, founder of St. Paul's Choir School, Harvard Square
- Chris Marinelli, NFL football player, Denver Broncos, Indianapolis Colts
- Edwin McDonough, actor
- John A. McNeice Jr, philanthropist, former chairman and CEO, Colonial Group
- James P. Moran Sr., Boston Redskins player, father of Virginia politicians Jim Moran and Brian Moran
- Mark Mulvoy, sports journalist and writer for The Boston Globe and Sports Illustrated
- Nnamdi Obukwelu, NFL player, Indianapolis Colts
- Joe Nash, NFL player, Seattle Seahawks
- Jake O'Brien, professional basketball player
- Joseph T. O'Callahan, Catholic priest and recipient of Medal of Honor
- Francis Patrick O'Connor, former Justice of Massachusetts Supreme Judicial Court
- Pietro Pezzati, painter
- Mike Ryan, NHL hockey player
- Walter V. Robinson, journalist
- Paul Sally, professor of mathematics and director of undergraduate studies at University of Chicago
- Francis X. Shea, Jesuit academic who served as president of College of St. Scholastica and chancellor of Antioch College
- Ryan Shea, professional hockey player for Chicago Blackhawks
- Mike Sullivan, former head coach of Pittsburgh Penguins, former NHL hockey player
- Ozzy Trapilo, football player for the Chicago Bears, formerly of Boston College
- Steve Trapilo, NFL football player
- Eric Turner, singer
- Mike Vasil, baseball pitcher for the Chicago White Sox
- Erik Vendt, Olympic swimmer, gold medalist 2008, silver medalist in both 2000 and 2004 Summer Olympics
- Dan Wetzel, journalist
- Jerry York, former Boston College men's hockey head coach
