= Monan Park =

Baseball stadium in Boston, Massachusetts

- Interactive map of Monan Park
- Full name: J. Donald Monan, SJ Park
- Address: 150 William T. Morrissey Boulevard
- Location: Boston, Massachusetts, U.S.
- Coordinates: 42.315854°N 71.042351°W
- Capacity: 500 (baseball)
- Type: Baseball park
- Surface: Artificial turf
- Record attendance: 379 (May 25, 2019: UMass Boston vs. New England College)
- Field size: Left Field: 310 ft (94.5 m); Deep Left-Center: 379 ft (115.5 m); Center Field: 389 ft 9 in (118.8 m); Deep Right-Center: 420 ft (128 m); Right Center: 380 ft (115.8 m); Right Field: 302 ft (92 m)
- Public transit: JFK/UMass station: Red Line; Greenbush Line; Fall River/New Bedford Line; Kingston Line; MBTA bus: 8

Construction
- Groundbreaking: June 11, 2015
- Built: 2015
- Opened: March 7, 2016

Tenants
- BC High Eagles (MIAA) (2016-present); UMass Boston Beacons (NCAA) (2016-present)

Website
- beaconsathletics.com

Monan Park is a 500-seat baseball stadium located in Boston, Massachusetts, on Columbia Point. Monan Park is jointly owned by Boston College High School and the University of Massachusetts Boston. When it opened in the spring of 2016, it immediately became the home of both schools' baseball programs. Monan Park features the same outfield dimensions as Fenway Park and features a similar Green Monster in left-field.

The Boston College High School Eagles are members of the Catholic Conference and compete at the Division 1 level of the MIAA. The UMass Boston Beacons are members of the Little East Conference of the NCAA Division III.

== History ==
Athletes from both Boston College High School and the University of Massachusetts Boston gathered for the ceremonial groundbreaking on June 11, 2015. The complex is named after former Boston College president and chancellor J. Donald Monan, SJ.

Before the construction of Monan Park, the UMass Boston Beacons had to play their home games at Campanelli Stadium in Brockton, Massachusetts to meet the NCAA Division III site requirements. Monan Park marks the first time in UMass Boston's program history that they will have a home field. UMass Boston hosted MIT in the first game at Monan Park, which they won by a score of 4–0 in front of a crowd of 155.

The project was anchored by a $2 million donation from the Yawkey Foundation. In addition to the baseball stadium, there is a secondary multipurpose field used for baseball, soccer, and lacrosse.

Monan Park has been the home of the Bay State Games baseball tournament every summer since 2016. Monan Park has hosted the Little East Conference baseball tournament twice since its opening. The park was the host in its inaugural season and was host again in 2018, which UMass Boston won. In 2019, it was host to the NCAA Division III baseball tournament Regional and Super Regional. In Game 3 of the 2019 Super Regional, Monan Park set its record attendance of 379, as UMass Boston won 6–2 to advance to the Division III College World Series.

In June 2019, Monan Park hosted a neutral-site Cape Cod Baseball League game between the Wareham Gatemen and Yarmouth-Dennis Red Sox.

== Access and transportation ==
Monan Park can be reached from JFK/UMass station, which is served by the Red Line and three MBTA Commuter Rail lines.

== See also ==
- Fenway Park
- List of U.S. baseball stadiums by capacity
