= Robert Skeris =

American theologist (19??-2025)

- Born: Robert A. Skeris; May 11, 1935; Sheboygan, Wisconsin, U.S.
- Died: February 18, 2025 (aged 89)
- Citizenship: American
- Education: University of Notre Dame; University of Cologne; University of Bonn
- Occupations: Roman Catholic priest, theologian, professor
- Known for: Sacred music, liturgical studies, hymnology
- Awards: Knight Commander of the Equestrian Order of the Holy Sepulchre of Jerusalem

Robert A. Skeris was an American Roman Catholic priest and professor. He was based in the Archdiocese of Milwaukee beginning in 1961.

== Education ==
Skeris earned a Master of Arts (MA) degree in Liturgical Studies from the University of Notre Dame and studied at the Universities of Cologne and Bonn in Germany. He earned his Doctor of Theology in 1975 from the University of Bonn.

== Career ==
Skeris contributed to the founding of the Consociatio Internationalis Musicae Sacrae. As associate professor of theology at the University of Dallas, he taught liturgy, sacramental theology, ecclesiology and apologetics, as well as church music at the adjacent Holy Trinity Seminary.

After having pursued further research in hymnology at the University of Southern California and the Claremont Colleges, Skeris was appointed Director of the Hymnology Section at the International Institute for Hymnological and Ethno-Musicological Studies in Maria Laach in 1978, where he worked for the West German Bishops' Conference and the Academy of Science in Mainz as researcher in charge of the Roman Catholic contribution to the joint ecumenical project Das Deutsche Kirchenlied, a critical edition of congregational hymns printed in the German language area between 1481 and 1800.

Having served from 1986 through 1989 as Professor and Prefetto della Casa at the Pontifical Institute of Sacred Music in Rome, where he also had been named Consultor to the Vatican's Office of Pontifical Ceremonies, Skeris joined the faculty of Christendom College in 1990. Through the decade of his service at Christendom as Associate Chaplain, Chairman of the Theology Department, director of the Christendom College Choir and Schola Gregoriana, and organizer of the annual summer Church Music Colloquium, he made Christendom College not only a center of intellectual renewal, but a genuine center for the restoration of the sacred. He served as professor emeritus of Sacred Theology beginning in 2000.

== Death ==
Skeris died on February 18, 2025.

== Publications ==
- Co-author of Das deutsche Kirchenlied: Kritische Gesamtausgabe der Melodien (Kassel, Basel, London, New York: Baerenreiter, 1993)
- Author of 13 articles on liturgy, sacred music, etc. in the Encyclopedia of Catholic Doctrine, ed. Russell Shaw (OSV, 1997)
- Numerous articles in such publications as Crisis, Sacred Music, Pastoral Music, Proceedings of the Fellowship of Catholic Scholars
- Appearances on EWTN; conducted sacred music workshops in the Diocese of Portland, Maine, and elsewhere.

== Affiliations ==
Skeris was a Knight Commander of the Equestrian Order of the Holy Sepulchre, and President Emeritus of CMAA (the Church Music Association of America). He was also Director of the Centre for Ward Method Studies at the B.T. Rome School of Music at The Catholic University of America (CUA).
