= Theodore Marier =

American classical composer

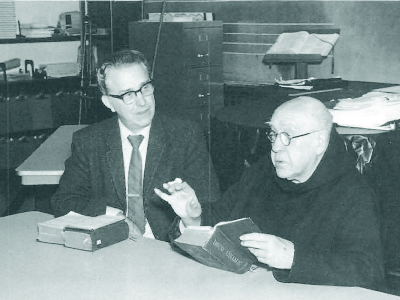
Theodore Marier and Dom Joseph Gajard in 1965

Theodore Norbert Marier (October 17, 1912 – February 24, 2001) was a church musician, educator, arranger and scholar of Gregorian Chant. He founded St. Paul's Choir School in Cambridge, Massachusetts in 1963, and served as the second president of the Church Music Association of America.

== Life and career ==
Marier once said he "got hooked on chant" as a college student in the 1930s when he heard a 78 rpm recording of the choir of the Abbey of Solesmes, France. "It was the most beautiful music I had ever heard," he said. He later studied at Solesmes under Dom Joseph Gajard.

A graduate of Boston College, he was director of band music there from 1934 to 1942. In 1940 he received a master's degree from Harvard, and over the course of the years he was also a choir director or lecturer at Emmanuel College, Newton College of the Sacred Heart, and Boston University.

In 1934, Marier began fifty-two years of musical service at The Church of St. Paul (Harvard Square) in Cambridge, Massachusetts, first as organist and from 1947 as choir director. In 1963, with Monsignor Augustine F. Hickey, he founded a choir school associated with the parish, St. Paul's Choir School, and directed it until his retirement in 1986. The school later became known as the Boston Archdiocesan Choir School, and the choir, the Boston Boy Choir, though as of April 2014, the school's original name has been reestablished. During his tenure as choir director, Marier encouraged the composition of new sacred works by contemporary composers for the choir at St. Paul’s, such as Missa Quis sicut te (1962) by Russell Woollen.

In the 1950s, Marier was a faculty member of the Pius X School of Liturgical Music at Manhattanville College. In that capacity, he contributed to editing The Pius X Hymnal (1953; 2nd ed. 1956).

In 1966 he was elected president of the Church Music Association of America, succeeding Rembert Weakland.

After his 1986 retirement from St. Paul's, Marier became Justine Bayard Ward Professor and faculty adviser of the doctoral program in liturgical music and Director of the Center for Ward Studies at The Catholic University of America. He was also a member of the board of directors of the Institut für Hymnologische und Musikethnologische Studien, Maria Laach, Germany; and a fellow of the American Guild of Organists.

Marier also studied at Cambridge University, England, and made recordings with the Boston Symphony under Seiji Ozawa. He edited two hymnals: Cantus Populi (1963) and Hymns, Psalms, and Spiritual Canticles (two editions, 1974 and 1983).

== Honors ==
Marier received honorary doctorates in music from The Catholic University of America, the Pontifical Institute of Sacred Music, Rome, and Saint Anselm College. In 1984, in recognition of his fifty years of service to Saint Paul's and the Catholic Church at large, Pope John Paul II named Marier a Knight Commander of Saint Gregory. He was invested by then-Archbishop Bernard Law at Saint Paul's. In December 1996, he received the Saint Ignatius Award from his alma mater, Boston College High School.

== Personal ==
Theodore Marier was a good friend of French composer Jean Langlais. He was also a friend of the Benedictine Abbey of Regina Laudis in Connecticut and assigned the copyright to his last book, A Gregorian Chant Master Class, to the Abbey.

== Legacy ==
Cardinal Bernard Francis Law celebrated Marier's funeral Mass at the Church of St. Paul in Cambridge. In the 1950s Cardinal Law, while an undergraduate at Harvard, had sung under Marier's direction.

"Professor Marier effectively transmitted his inspiration about Gregorian chant to generations of Catholic musicians", wrote Helen Hull Hitchcock, editor of the Adoremus Bulletin. She had been recruited to sing in a schola Marier conducted at a symposium of the Church Music Association of America where she had given a lecture on liturgical translation. "It is a privileged memory", Mrs. Hitchcock recalled. "His enthusiasm was as impressive as his musical expertise. No one has done more to promote the musical tradition of the Church in America".

== Works ==
- The Pius X Hymnal (Boston, MA: McLaughlin & Reilly, 1953; rev. ed. 1956) - co-editor, contributor (often falsely attributed solely to Marier)
- Cantus Populi, a hymnal (Boston, MA: McLaughlin & Reilly, 1963) - editor (out of print)
- Hymns, Psalms, and Spiritual Canticles, a hymnal (Belmost, MA: BACS Publishing, 1974; rev. ed. 1983) - editor (out of print)
- A Gregorian Chant Practicum (Washington DC, The Catholic University of America Press, 1992) ISBN 9780813202136

Published posthumously

- A Gregorian Chant Master Class (by Scott Turkington) (Bethlehem, CT: Abbey of Regina Laudis, 2002) ISBN 9780972220507
- The Restoration of Gregorian Chant: Solesmes and the Vatican Edition (translator, with William Skinner) (Washington DC, The Catholic University of America Press, 2003) ISBN 9780813213484

Compositions

- The Order of Mass (English Mass) (out of print)
- Holy, Holy, Holy - four settings (out of print)
- Our Father - I (out of print)
- Lamb of God two settings (out of print)
- Missa Brevis (for Congregation, SATB Choir, and Organ, originally titled "Mass for Advent and Lent") (out of print)
- Several hymns, Magnificat, gospel acclamations, and psalm settings (several items available in The St. Paul's Hymnal)
- You are a Priest of God (unpublished)
- The Lord's My Shepherd (unpublished)
- Adam Lay y'Bounden (unpublished)
- Arrangements of: Silent Night, Creator of the Stars of night, (unpublished)
- Arrangement of Angels We Have Heard on High(out of print)

Organ

- Christmas Suite for Organ (A Sequence of Carols and Hymns) (out of print)
- Gregorian Chants: Two Suites (Suite 1: Blessed Sacrament; Suite 2 Blessed Virgin Mary) (1946) (out of print)
- Processiones Liturgicae, editor and arranger (out of print)
- Voix Celeste, editor and compiler (1942)

== Sources ==
also

- Glover, Raymond F., ed. The Hymnal 1982 Companion. Volume II., p. 518. New York: The Church Hymnal Corporation, 1984.
- With One Voice: reference companion
