= Cletus Madsen =

American Catholic priest

Rev. Msgr. Cletus P. Madsen
- Born: December 1, 1905; Burlington, Iowa, US
- Died: July 16, 2002 (aged 96); Davenport, Iowa, US
- Resting place: Mount Calvary Cemetery, Davenport, Iowa
- Education: St. Ambrose College; Pontifical North American College; St. Cecilia Academy; State University of Iowa; Eastman School of Music
- Known for: Liturgical Renewal Movement in the Catholic Church
- Title: Reverend Monsignor

Cletus Madsen (December 1, 1905 – July 16, 2002) was a 20th-century Catholic priest of the Diocese of Davenport in the US state of Iowa. He was involved the Liturgical Movement in the Catholic Church in the mid-20th century.

== Biography ==
=== Early life and education ===
Madsen was born in Burlington, Iowa, to Mose and Mary (Mennen) Madsen. He was raised in Davenport, Iowa, where he was educated at St. Ambrose Academy and received his bachelor's degree from St. Ambrose College. He studied for the priesthood at the Pontifical North American College in Rome. He was ordained a priest for the Davenport Diocese on October 25, 1931, at the German College in Rome by Cardinal Francesco Marchetti Selvaggiani. He did graduate studies in music at St. Cecilia Academy in Rome, the State University of Iowa and Eastman School of Music in Rochester, New York.

=== Diocese of Davenport ===
Father Madsen's first assignment in the diocese was as an assistant pastor at Sacred Heart Cathedral. In 1932 he was assigned to the Fine Arts Department at St. Ambrose College. He would eventually become chairman of the department. He served as chaplain at Immaculate Conception Academy in Davenport, in addition to his teaching, starting in 1934. In 1935, he began with other music educators in the diocese, diocesan music festivals. They included 15 to 22 schools, and they continued until 1970.

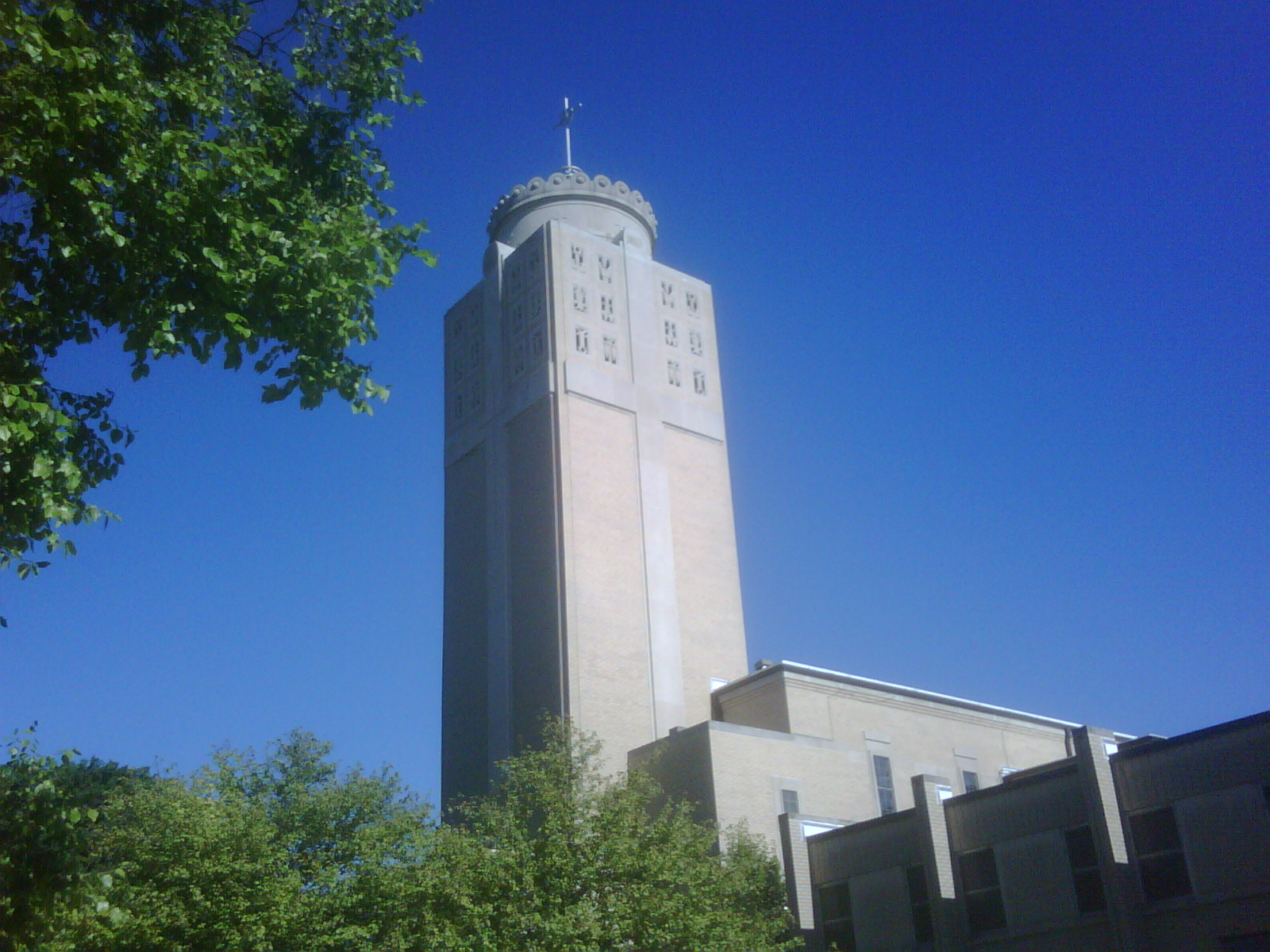
Christ the King Chapel on the campus of St. Ambrose University where Madsen served as chaplain in the 1960s

By 1944, he was the director of the college's choir as well as the adult and boys' choirs at Sacred Heart Cathedral. When Bishop Henry Rohlman was transferred to the Archdiocese of Dubuque in 1944, the Sacred Heart choir, composed of men and women, as well as trumpets was a part of the farewell liturgy in the cathedral. Several months later they performed a similar program at the installation of Bishop Ralph Hayes. Father Madsen was called into the bishop's office and asked why women were in the choir and why trumpets were played in church? The next time either performed in a liturgy at the cathedral was the installation of Bishop Gerald O'Keefe 23 years later.

In 1950, Madsen began to write a column on liturgical renewal in The Catholic Messenger, the diocesan newspaper which had a national edition. He reminded his readers a rule of Pope Leo XIII, "It is absolutely forbidden that any music should be performed in church which has themes from theatrical works, from dance music or profane pieces, such as popular songs, love songs, etc." He encouraged Gregorian Chant and singing other hymns in both Latin and English. He encouraged the establishment of boys' choirs, teaching chant to the students in Catholic schools and colleges, teachers and religious. Simple Mass Propers were offered for use in parishes. The idea was to involve the congregation in singing the Mass and full participation in the liturgy.

Change, however, did not come about easily. Madsen sent out a questionnaire to 148 pastors in the diocese, based on materials prepared by the National Catholic Music Education Association (NCMEA—now known as the National Association of Pastoral Musicians). Of the 88 responses, only 19 pastors reported they had a program promoting active lay participation in the liturgy. Ten of these parishes had a Dialogue Mass and seven said they had a sung High Mass. Forty-six parishes with schools, however, had the children chanting the Ordinary and Propers of the Mass. Full liturgical participation was also the goal of Madsen's in organizing the Davenport Diocesan Priests' Choir.

=== Liturgical renewal in the United States ===
Madsen's work was not limited to the Davenport Diocese. He was chair of the Liturgical Department of the NCMEA for six years. By the end of the 1950s the Dialogue Mass had become official and new missals for the laity were developed. Madsen served as president of the NCMEA when it prepared Our Parish Prays and Sings. He also served as vice president and a member of the board of directors of the NCMEA. He co-ordinated study groups at the annual North American Liturgical Weeks and was on the board of directors of the National Liturgical Conference. In 1964, he helped establish the Church Music Association of America, and was chosen as its first vice-president.

In addition to the annual Diocesan Music Festival, Madsen helped found the annual Iowa Catholic College Music Festival and was co-founder of the Iowa Catholic High School Music Festival. He also organized the Tri-City Oratorio Society.

Father Madsen would find validation in his life's work when the Catholic bishops from around the world voted to approve, and Pope Paul VI promulgated, Sacrosanctum Concilium during the Second Vatican Council. The Constitution on the Sacred Liturgy called for full and active participation for all members of the church in all its liturgies.

=== Later life and death ===
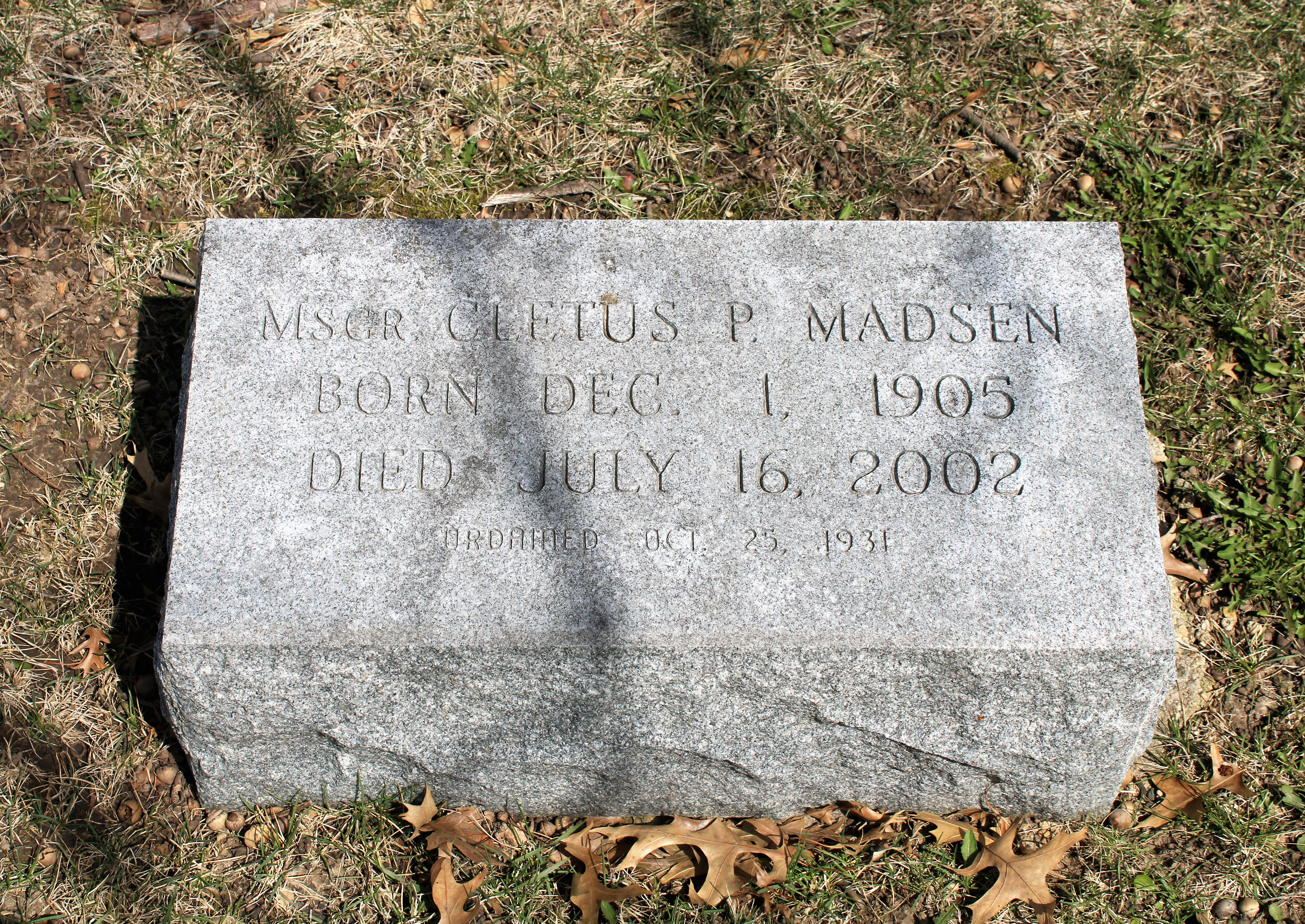
Msgr. Madsen's grave in Mount Calvary Cemetery

In the early 1960s, Madsen helped establish the Liturgical Commission of the Diocese of Davenport. From 1962 to 1965, he served as the student chaplain at St. Ambrose. In 1965, he finished his teaching career at St. Ambrose and became pastor of St. Mary's Church in Fairfield, Iowa. He also served as Dean of the Ottumwa Deanery at the same time. In 1970, he was transferred to St. Wenceslaus Church in Iowa City, and became the Episcopal Vicar of the Iowa City Vicariate. He became a trustee of St. Ambrose in 1970 and joined the board of directors in 1976. In 1973, Pope Paul VI named Madsen an Honorary Prelate. Bishop O'Keefe had nominated him in recognition for his leadership in liturgical music and initiating the diocesan music festivals. In 1979, Madsen Hall in Galvin Fine Arts Center at St. Ambrose was named in his honor, and he received an honorary doctorate from the school in 1982.

After he retired from full-time ministry in 1981, he resided at St. Vincent Center in Davenport and served as Assistant to the President of St. Ambrose University until 1998. Msgr. Madsen died in 2002 at the Kahl Home for the Aged and Infirm at the age of 96. His funeral was held in Christ the King Chapel and he was buried in the Priests' Circle at Mount Calvary Cemetery in Davenport.
