= Robert Braucher =

American judge (1916–1981)

Associate Justice of the Massachusetts Supreme Judicial Court
- In office January 18, 1971 – August 26, 1981
- Appointed by: Francis Sargent
- Preceded by: Paul Kirk
- Succeeded by: Francis O'Connor

Personal details
- Born: February 23, 1916 New York City, New York, U.S.
- Died: August 26, 1981 (aged 65) Arlington, Massachusetts, U.S.
- Party: Republican
- Education: Haverford College (BA); Harvard University (LLB)

Robert Braucher (February 23, 1916 – August 26, 1981) was an associate justice of the Massachusetts Supreme Judicial Court from January 18, 1971, until his death.

== Early life and education ==
Braucher was born in New York City in 1916. He was graduated from Haverford College with high honors in 1936 and from Harvard Law School in 1939, magna cum laude and salutatorian of his class. He served as an editor of the Harvard Law Review, was a finalist in the Ames moot court competition, and winner of the Beale Prize for the best paper on the conflict of laws. From 1939 to 1941 he practiced law in New York City. He entered the United States Army Air Forces during World War II and, while in service, received the Distinguished Flying Cross and the Air Medal.

== Teaching career ==
Towards the end of his military service in 1945, Braucher was approached to teach at Columbia University Law School, but Harvard professor Erwin Griswold arranged a better offer from the Harvard Law School. Braucher began teaching at Harvard in January 1946, and was a professor at Harvard Law School from 1949 to 1971, specializing in contracts and business law. While at Harvard, he took a leave of absence and served as Fulbright lecturer at Chuo and Tokyo Universities in 1959. He taught as a visiting professor at the University of Minnesota Law School during the academic year 1968-1969.

He was active in the National Conference of Commissioners on Uniform State Laws, serving as Commissioner from Massachusetts from 1954 to 1971, and as vice president of the Conference from 1967 to 1970. He was also active in sections of the American Bar Association. He was chairman of the National Commission on Consumer Finance from 1969 to 1971 and of the National Institute for Consumer Justice. He led the team that wrote a Model Anti-Discrimination Act, and he testified before the Senate Judiciary Committee in favor of the Equal Rights Amendment.

== Judicial career ==
In 1971, he was appointed Associate Justice of the Massachusetts Supreme Judicial Court by Governor Francis W. Sargent and served in that capacity until the time of his death. While serving on the court, he continued to teach part-time at Harvard Law School and at Boston University Law School.

Justice Braucher's first opinion, published on March 5, 1971, concerned an action in contract involving the applicability of the Uniform Commercial Code and the rights of a judgment creditor. His final opinion, published on August 7, 1981, concerned the consequences of a wrongful dishonor of checks, also under the Uniform Commercial Code.

Noted decisions include Corning Glass Works v. Ann & Hope, Inc. of Danvers, overruling General Elec. Co. v. Kimball Jewelers, Inc., and holding that the nonsigner provision of the Fair Trade Law was an unconstitutional delegation of legislative power to private parties; and Green v. Commissioner of Corps. & Taxation, rejecting the concept that a woman's domicil is always that of her husband; Hendrickson v. Sears, holding that the statute of limitations did not commence to run in favor of an attorney until the client discovered, or reasonably should have discovered, the attorney's error; Hershkoff v. Board of Registrars of Voters of Worcester, concerning the domicil of students for voting purposes; Carpenter v. Suffolk Franklin Sav. Bank, a purported class action concerning mortgagors' asserted rights to savings banks' earnings on real estate tax payments; and Secretary of the Commonwealth v. City Clerk of Lowell, holding that, absent fraud, people may select and change their names freely.

Stating that "judge-made rules of law are to be tailored to justice rather than to abstract logic", he once urged in dissent that rules concerning the admission of hearsay evidence should be greatly simplified to admit hearsay "unless the trial judge in his or her sound discretion thinks it's fair to exclude it". In his dissent in Commonwealth v. Manning, referring to "a legal tradition, established by men" and in effect urging a "rape shield" rule as part of the common law, he wrote forcefully against the use of reputation evidence to impeach the testimony of female victims of sex crimes.

== Law reform work ==
While teaching at Harvard Law School, Braucher served as the Reporter for the American Law Institute's Restatement (Second) of Contracts. When Braucher joined the Supreme Judicial Court in 1971, he was succeeded on the Contracts project by Professor E. Allan Farnsworth of Columbia Law School. Published in 1981, the Restatement (Second) of Contracts is the quintessential guide to the modern common law of contracts. It covers fundamental principles, providing a complete, coherent overview of contract law.

== Sources ==
Material on this page has been adapted from Robert Braucher, Memorial, 387 Mass. 1223 (1982), a special sitting of the Supreme Judicial Court held at Boston on September 21, 1982. Because this information has been printed as a court proceeding in an official Reporter of Decisions, it is in the public domain.

Legal offices
Preceded by Paul Kirk	Associate Justice of the Massachusetts Supreme Judicial Court; 1971–1981	Succeeded by Francis O'Connor
