= Francis P. O'Connor =

American judge

Associate Justice of the Massachusetts Supreme Judicial Court
- In office December 4, 1981 – September 1, 1997
- Appointed by: Edward J. King

Associate Justice of the Massachusetts Superior Court
- In office 1976–1981
- Appointed by: Michael S. Dukakis

Personal details
- Born: Francis Patrick O'Connor; December 12, 1927 Boston, Massachusetts, U.S.
- Died: August 3, 2007 (aged 79) Worcester, Massachusetts, U.S.
- Spouse: Ann E. O’Brien (m. 1955)
- Children: 10
- Education: College of the Holy Cross (AB); Boston College (LLB)

Military service
- Branch/service: United States Army
- Rank: Technician Fifth Grade

Francis Patrick O'Connor (December 12, 1927 – August 3, 2007) was an American lawyer and jurist from Massachusetts. He was long-time associate justice on the Massachusetts Supreme Judicial Court who was noted for his frequent and thorough dissents.

== Early life, education and military service ==
He was born in Boston to Thomas and Florence O'Connor, and was raised in Belmont. He attended Belmont Public Schools and graduated from Boston College High School in 1945. He graduated from the College of the Holy Cross in 1950, after serving two years in the U.S. Army during the occupation of Korea.

In 1953, he graduated from Boston College Law School and was admitted to the Massachusetts Bar, and later to the U.S. District Court for the District of Massachusetts and the United States Court of Appeals for the First Circuit.

== Early career ==
O'Connor served as a law clerk to the Honorable Raymond S. Wilkins, Chief Justice of the Massachusetts Supreme Judicial Court, from 1953 to 1954.

From 1954 to 1976, Justice O'Connor practiced law at Friedman, Atherton, Sisson & Kozol in Boston, and Mason, Crotty, Dunn & O'Connor and Wolfson, Moynihan, Dodson & O'Connor in Worcester.

Prior to his tenure on the bench, he served as a member of the Supreme Judicial Court Advisory Committee on the Rules of Civil Procedure and the Supreme Judicial Court's Mental Health Legal Advisors Committee.

O'Connor received honorary Doctor of Laws degrees from the New England School of Law and Suffolk University Law School.

== As justice ==
In 1976, on the recommendation of his peers at the Bar Association, Governor Michael S. Dukakis appointed Justice O'Connor to the Massachusetts Superior Court, where he served with distinction for 5 years.

In October 1981, Governor Edward J. King announced his intention to nominate O'Connor to the Massachusetts Supreme Judicial Court. Governor King appointed O'Connor to the Court in hopes he would be a Justice who would reliably oppose abortion, but Justice O'Connor made it clear to the Governor's Council he would not be easily pigeonholed–– notably breaking with conservative jurisprudence on issues such as the death penalty. Later that month, the Massachusetts Governor's Council made the unusual move of suspending the customary one-week waiting period, and voting unanimously in favor of O'Connor's confirmation the same day as his hearing.

Upon his appointment to the bench, O'Connor became the first Supreme Judicial Court Law Clerk to return to the state's highest court as an associate justice and the first graduate of Boston College Law School to serve on the Supreme Judicial Court.

Justice O'Connor was widely recognized in the legal community for the respectful tone he set in the courtroom, his honesty, his integrity, and the courtesy he extended to all parties and counsel who appeared before him. At a special 2008 sitting of the Supreme Judicial Court held in Justice O'Connor's memory, a representative from the Massachusetts Bar Association noted that for years, O'Connor biography in Who's Who in America was just three lines–– followed by a list of his ten children.

=== "Great Dissenter" ===
O'Connor was known for his detailed decisions, sometimes opposing the majority on the Court, which led to the nickname the "Great Dissenter".

In one such dissent, O'Connor argued that the Court majority's decision to create 'buffer zones' between protestors and abortion clinics would "impermissibly chill" people's right to protest.

Though noted for his dissents, O'Connor wrote numerous majority opinions of significant importance. In a 1987 majority opinion that denied a woman the right to sue for damages if her boyfriend was injured in a work accident, O'Connor wrote that if unmarried couples were given the same rights as married couples, it would subvert the institution of marriage.

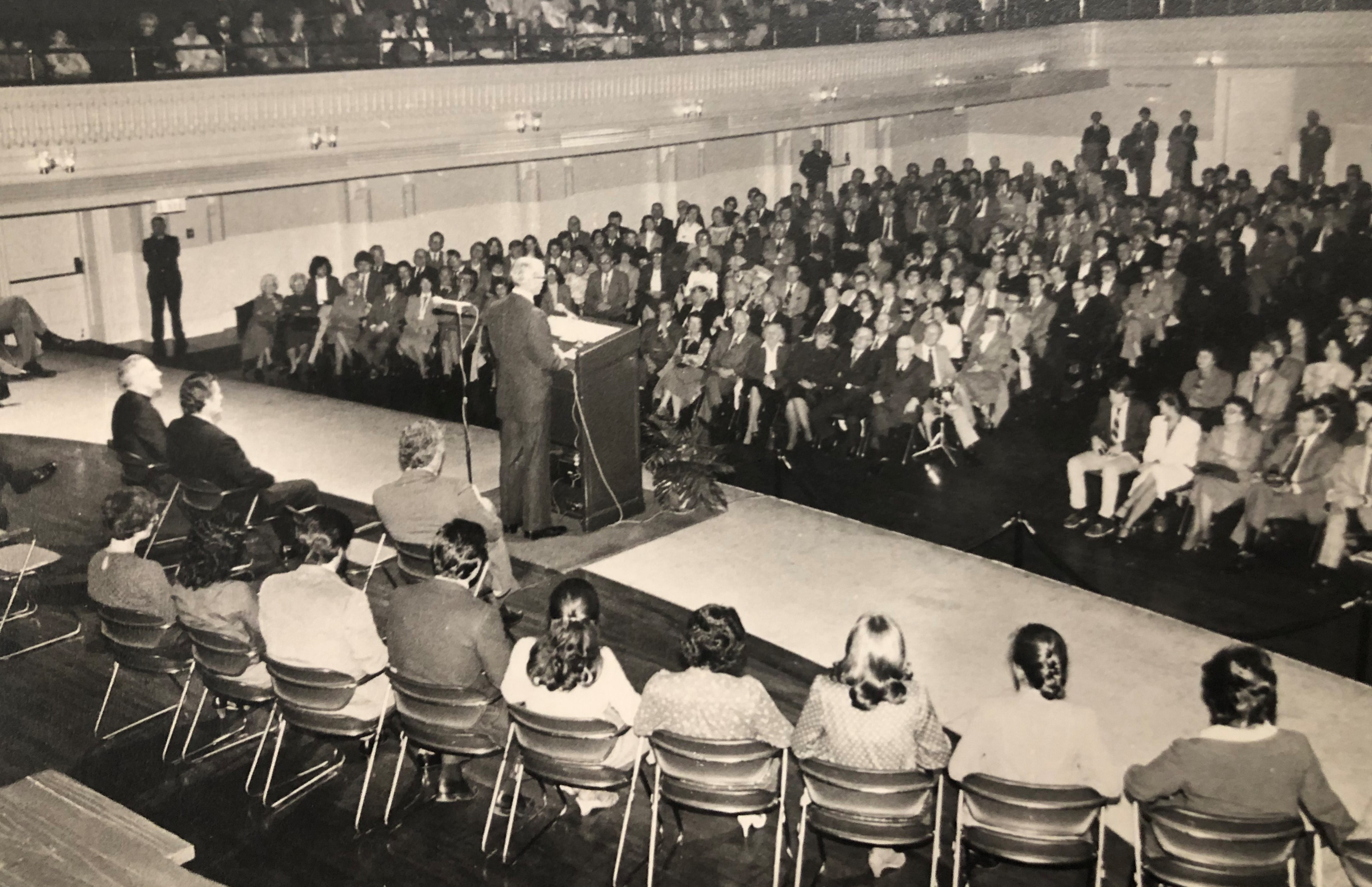
Ceremony swearing in Justice O'Connor as associate justice. Seen behind are Governor Edward J. King and Senator Edward M. Kennedy

Similarly, in 1993 O'Connor acted for the court when he refused to sign an injunction which prohibited queer people from marching in South Boston's St. Patrick's Day Parade.

== Later years ==
Justice O'Connor announced his retirement from the Court in early 1997. In an interview with The Boston Globe following the announcement, he joked that "Sure, I'll miss it. But I won't be sitting around the house with my head down missing it. I am going to do some other stuff... I'm going to look for work as a greenskeeper." In recognition of his year's of service to the Supreme Judicial Court Substance Abuse Project Task Force, O'Connor was named honorary chairman upon his retirement.

In 2000, O'Connor was diagnosed with Alzheimer's disease, from which he died in August 2007.

Upon learning of O'Connor's death, Governor Deval Patrick issued a statement in which he said:

I was deeply saddened to learn of the passing of former Supreme Judicial Court justice Francis P. O'Connor. Justice O'Connor served our highest court with honor and distinction for many years and was widely respected and admired for his intellect, his integrity and humanity, and his commitment to the legal community and beyond.

Justice Greaney, who served on the bench with O'Connor was quoted as saying:

He was one of the most distinguished and knowledgeable judges that I know. He approached each case with impartiality, with a great deal of legal research and thought, and wrote opinions that would stand as precedent long after he retired from the court.

Justice O'Connor and his wife, Ann, had 10 children, 34 grandchildren, and two great-grandchildren.

Legal offices
Preceded by Robert Braucher	Associate Justice of the Massachusetts Supreme Judicial Court; 1981–1997	Succeeded by Roderick L. Ireland
