= Edwin McDonough =

American actor (1943–2016)

- Born: c. 1943; Milton, Massachusetts, U.S.
- Died: February 9, 2016 (aged 72); Needham, Massachusetts, U.S.
- Education: Boston College (BA, MA); New York University (PhD)
- Spouse: Patricia Shannon McNally
- Military career
- Branch: United States Army; National Security Agency

Edwin J. McDonough (c. 1943 – February 9, 2016) was an American theater and screen actor. His film and television credits included Reversal of Fortune in 1990 and Kinsey in 2004. He appeared in eight Broadway productions during his career, notably the 1974 revival of A Moon for the Misbegotten, as well as regional theater productions throughout the United States.

== Early life and education ==
Born in Milton, Massachusetts, McDonough graduated from Boston College High School. He then enrolled at Boston College, where he completed two degrees in English literature. He relocated to Manhattan in 1969, where he enrolled in a doctoral program at New York University. He later completed his doctoral thesis, "Quintero Directs O'Neill."

== Career ==
McDonough enlisted in the United States Army, where he served for two years at the National Security Agency (NSA) as a Middle East analyst.

McDonough commuted from Boston to New York City for 45 years to pursue theater, film and television. He was cast in eight Broadway productions and worked in regional theater nationwide. In addition to film and theater, his television credits included guest roles in Law & Order, Sex and the City and Ed. He later moved to Needham, Massachusetts.

== Personal life ==
Edwin McDonough died at his home in Needham, Massachusetts, on February 9, 2016, at the age of 72. He was survived by his wife, Patricia Shannon McNally, three stepchildren, Michael McNally, Lee McNally, and Katherine McNally, and four grandchildren. He was buried at St. Mary Cemetery in Needham.

== Filmography ==
=== Film ===
Year	Title	Role	Notes
1980	It's My Turn	Professor	
1982	Hanky Panky	Radar Technician #1	
1990	Reversal of Fortune	Bailiff	
2004	Kinsey	Mr. Morrissey	
2005	The Eyes of Van Gogh	Reverend Rochedieu	
2009	The Blind	Minister	

=== Television ===
Year	Title	Role	Notes
1975	A Moon for the Misbegotten	Mike Hogan	Television film
1999, 2001	Law & Order	Patrik Collin / Harold De Groot	2 episodes
2002	Sex and the City	Bunny's Atty. Allan	Episode: "Critical Condition"
2004	Ed	Reverend Carp	Episode: "Happily Ever After"
2011	Boardwalk Empire	Priest	Episode: "Battle of the Century"
