= St. Thomas University =

St. Thomas University or University of St. Thomas may refer to:

- Saint Thomas Aquinas University, Colombia
- Saint Thomas Aquinas University of the North, Tucumán province, Argentina
- St. Thomas University (Canada), Fredericton, New Brunswick
- St. Thomas University, Japan
- St. Thomas University (Florida), United States
  - St. Thomas University College of Law
- Pontifical University of Saint Thomas Aquinas, Rome, Italy
- Universidad Santo Tomás de Aquino, Dominican Republic
- University of Santo Tomas, Manila, Philippines
- University of St. Thomas (Minnesota), United States
- University of St. Thomas (Texas), United States

== See also ==
- University of the Virgin Islands, Saint Thomas, U.S. Virgin Islands
- International Council of Universities of Saint Thomas Aquinas
