= John A. McNeice Jr =

John A. McNeice Jr (born 1940) of Canton, Massachusetts, is a noted philanthropist and the former chairman and CEO of the Colonial Group. He served on the board of trustees of both Boston College and Boston College High School as of 2006 and stepped down from the Boston College High School board in 2017. He also serves on the board of directors of the Weston Jesuit School of Theology. He is a Double Eagle, having graduated from BC High in 1958 and BC in 1962.

== Philanthropy ==
On 21 November 2005, McNeice and his wife made the largest-ever charitable contribution to a Catholic secondary school when he donated $6 million to Boston College High School.

In 2006, he created largest-ever single endowment for student volunteerism and retreat programs when he donated $5 million to create the John and Margarete McNeice Student Formation Fund.

He is on the Founder's Committee of the Boston Irish Famine Memorial.

He is on the Executive Council of the Inner-City Scholarship Fund

He was the former chairman of the American Ireland Fund

He and his wife are primary sponsors of Caritas Carney Hospitals
