= John Robinson (church musician) =

English organist and choral conductor

John Robinson (born 1983) is an English Choral Conductor and Organist. Currently, he is the Director of Music at Blackburn Cathedral. He has led choral festivals for various organisations including the RSCM and Pueri Cantores. His choral recordings include releases on Decca Records and Sony Classical as well as regular broadcasts for the BBC. He has prepared Children's Choirs and soloists for leading conductors uncluding Charles Dutoit, Andris Nelsons and Keith Lockhart to sing with ensembles including Boston Symphony Orchestra, Boston Lyric Opera and Boston Pops. He is active as an Organ Recitalist, having performed in venues across the US and Europe, and recorded on the organ for Priory Records, Herald Records, Hyperion Records, Regent Records (UK) and Ambisonic.

== Education ==
Robinson was a chorister and Organ student of Roy Massey at Hereford Cathedral then Organ Scholar at Canterbury Cathedral working with David Flood. He became the Organ Scholar at St John's College, Cambridge with Christopher Robinson and David Hill. At University of Cambridge he won the Brian Runnett Prize for Organ, and the Plymouth National Young Organists' Competition. He became Fellow of The Royal College of Organists and graduated from Cambridge University with a degree in music.

== Career ==
=== Carlisle Cathedral ===
From 2005, Robinson was Assistant Organist at Carlisle Cathedral where he made several organ recordings for Priory Records including the Complete Organ Works of Samuel Sebastian Wesley and a recording of Romantic English Organ Music. He was the Director of Carlisle Cathedral Youth Choir, and of Cockermouth Harmonic Society.

=== Canterbury Cathedral ===
In 2008, he became Assistant Organist at Canterbury Cathedral and organist of The King's School, Canterbury. He made a solo DVD of Canterbury Cathedral Organ with Priory Records, hailed as 'Recording of the Month' by Music Web International, as well as recordings with the Cathedral Choir and Choir of The King's School, Canterbury.

=== St. Paul's Choir School ===
In 2010, Robinson was appointed Organist and Director of Music at St. Paul's Choir School, in Harvard Square. There he was responsible for training the Choir of Men and Boys in daily sung liturgies, concerts, tours and recordings. Having professionalised the men of the choir, Robinson significantly widened the liturgical repertoire of the Choir. He oversaw collaborations with other choirs and orchestras, which raised the profile of the Choir both nationally and internationally. He led their first internationally released recording 'Christmas in Harvard Square'. Released with Decca Records the recording remained high on the Classical Billboard Charts for months after its release. Robinson acted as an advisor to various Church Music appointments, and appeared as an organist across the US. Under his direction the Choir released a second Internationally acclaimed album, 'Ave Maria' with Sony Classical. Robinson renewed the Choir's relationship with the Boston Symphony Orchestra

=== Blackburn Cathedral ===
In 2019 Robinson became Organist and Director of Music at Blackburn Cathedral. His first solo Organ recording was Editor's Choice in the 2022 Awards Edition of Gramophone Magazine and gained wide critical acclaim. He has directed the Cathedral Choirs live on BBC1 on Christmas Eve and Christmas Day 2022 and on BBC Radio 3. Blackburn Cathedral Choir broadcasts regularly on BBC Radio 3, most recently in October 2024.

Cultural offices
Preceded by Samuel Hudson	Organist and Master of the Choristers of Blackburn Cathedral; 2019–present	Succeeded by
