= St. Paul's Choir School =

Location
- 29 Mount Auburn Street; Cambridge, Massachusetts; United States; 42.3708°N 71.1154°W

Information
- Type: Private, Day, Choir school
- Motto: Repleatur os meum laude tua ("Let my mouth be filled with Your praise")
- Religious affiliation: Roman Catholic
- Established: 1963
- Headmaster: Patrick Moran
- Pastor: Rev. William T. Kelly
- Director of Music: Brandon Straub
- Faculty: 15
- Grades: 3-8
- Gender: Boys
- Enrollment: up to 65
- Campus: Urban
- Color: Maroon
- Website: www.saintpaulschoirschool.us
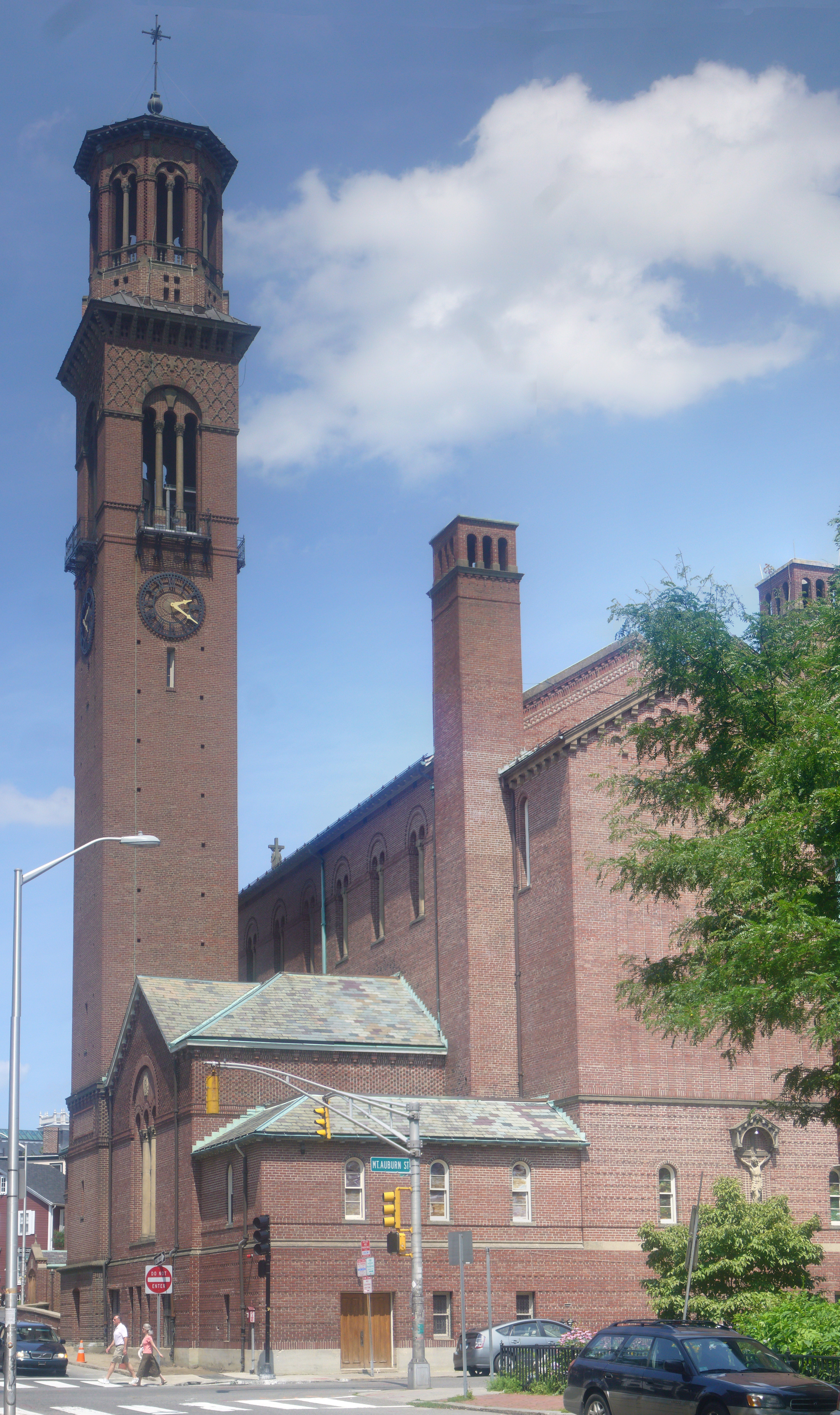
- The Church of St. Paul (Harvard Square), where St. Paul's Choir School is located

St. Paul's Choir School is a choir school located at St. Paul’s Church, Harvard Square in Cambridge, Massachusetts. Founded in 1963, by Theodore Marier, the middle school for boys in third through eighth grades is the only boys' choir school in the United States of America affiliated with the Catholic Church, and one of the few church-affiliated choir schools in the United States. The Choir School educates and trains the choirboys who sing soprano in the choir of St. Paul's, a choir of boys and men. The choir sings for liturgical services at St. Paul's Church and performs primarily in and around the Boston area. It is located within the Archdiocese of Boston.

== Choir ==
St. Paul's Choir is a traditional church choir of boys and men. The choir is composed of boys in grades 5-8 who attend St. Paul's Choir School, and men who are auditioned from local music schools such as Longy, New England Conservatory, and Boston Conservatory. Boys have been singing at St. Paul's since the church was built in 1923, and the choir has built a reputation for singing church music from Gregorian chant to contemporary works. Chiefly a liturgical choir, the boys have also appeared with numerous orchestras in and around Boston, and the full choir is in frequent demand to sing at concerts, weddings and funerals throughout the year.

== History ==
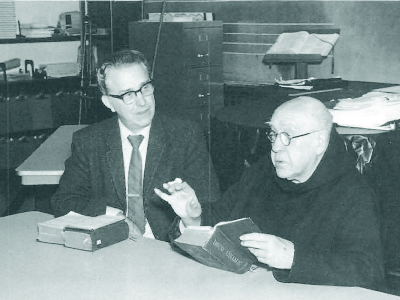
Founder Theodore Marier in 1965, with Gregorian chant expert Dom Joseph Gajard

St. Paul's Choir School was founded in 1963 by Theodore Marier and Monsignor Augustine F. Hickey as the result of the Vatican's 1958 Instruction on Sacred Music and Sacred Liturgy De musica sacra, which declared that every effort should be made that city center churches have their own boys' choir school. St. Paul's Choir School started in September with twenty-five fifth- through eighth-grade students chosen from throughout the Archdiocese of Boston. The school was designed as a four-year course for students of academic ability and musical talent, assigning two periods of each school day to music, as well as additional rehearsals with the men of the choir. The music program included sight reading, appreciation, theory, history, and instrumental studies. Under Marier's direction, the boys sang, initially with members of the Harvard Catholic Club, and later with the Schola Cantorum of St. Paul's, which had been formed years earlier by Marier to sing Gregorian chant at Mass. Harvard students also helped out with the recreation program.

During the school's first period, the choir made guest appearances with the Boston Symphony Orchestra at Symphony Hall and at Tanglewood, the Boston Philharmonic Orchestra, and the Handel and Haydn Society. They additionally performed the Nutcracker Suite annually with the Boston Ballet, directed by Arthur Fiedler.

During Marier's tenure, the school was renamed as the Boston Archdiocesan Choir School. After the school's 50th anniversary it returned to its original name.

Following Marier's retirement from the Choir School in 1986, John Dunn assumed the position as director of music, after having been involved in the church's music program since 1960 when he was a student at Harvard. He combined the roles of director of music of St. Paul Church and headmaster of the school, leading the choir in recordings, concerts, and tours throughout the final years of the twentieth century. Dunn maintained a consistent and increased enrollment at and oversaw the construction of a new educational facility in 1991. Towards the end of his tenure in 2007, the school became fully accredited by the New England Association of Schools and Colleges.

John Dunn announced his retirement in 2008 and, after a year-long search process, was succeeded as Director of Music by his long-time assistant, Jennifer Lester. Lester, a Fulbright scholar, studied organ with Michael Radulescu at the Academy of Music in Vienna, received her Bachelor of Music degree with honors in organ performance from the New England Conservatory of Music, and the Master of Music degree in choral conducting from Yale University, before her arrival at the choir school in 2000. She served as assistant music director, organist, director of the adult choir, handbell choir, and a teacher in the school.

In 2010, after an international search, John Robinson (Church Musician), then Assistant Organist at Canterbury Cathedral, was appointed Director of Music. Robinson worked to raise awareness of the Choir of St. Paul's as a primarily liturgical choir, increasing the number of sung liturgies and enlarging the repertoire of daily Mass music for boys' voices and for boys and men. Additionally, he oversaw the introduction of professional male singers to the Choir of St. Paul's and the implementation of the music theory curriculum by the Associated Board of the Royal Schools of Music. Beginning with the 2012 academic year, the school added a fourth-grade level. It is also a member of the International Boys' Schools Coalition (IBSC).

In 2015 the Choir of St. Paul's Church came to national and international recognition after the release of their album Christmas in Harvard Square on the AimHigher Recordings label. This universally acclaimed recording sold in large numbers, and brought awareness of the choir to a new level. In September 2017 the choir released their second album under John Robinson, Ave Maria.

John Robinson resigned as the Director of Music after his 9th year of teaching at the school in June 2019 and moved to Blackburn Cathedral in England. His successor was James Kennerley. Kennerley served from September 2019 until March 2023. The choir was then directed by Owen Reid, Interim Director of Music, until the end of the year. Over the summer, Richard Webster, who previously served as Director of music at Trinity church, in Copley Square, was appointed interim director of music while the school searched for a permanent successor. Brandon Straub was also appointed associate director. After the school year of 23-24, Brandon will assume the position of Director of Music.

== Student life ==
Students attend the choir school full-time, completing a rigorous academic program in addition to daily rehearsals and singing for the liturgy several times each week. The students are divided into three choirs: the Pre-choristers (boys who are in choral training), the Choristers (fifth to eighth graders who sing with the professional men as The Choir of St. Paul's), and the Chorus (boys whose voices are changing, or who enter as Chorus members, instead of Pre-Choristers). The Choristers sing four weekday masses (Tuesday, Wednesday, Thursday, Friday at 12.10 p.m.) each week, Thursday evening vespers, as well as the Sunday 11:00 High Mass with the professional men. The Chorus sing at the First Friday 12.10 Mass each month, and other special events. Each student's tuition is supplemented by a "working scholarship," whereby the choristers are expected to sing at weddings, funerals and concerts throughout the school year.

All students study mathematics, science, literature, language arts, social studies, geography, religion, music theory, and french. Latin was reintroduced to the curriculum in 2018-2019. In addition to these academic subjects, all students study the piano, and several also study the organ. Opportunities to perform include regular informal concerts, as well as biannual adjudications. Though the school does not participate in any sports leagues, there is a school basketball team that competes against other Catholic schools in exhibition games. Many students participate in sports outside of school.

As of 2021, student enrollment at the school is approximately 40. New students are admitted to the third grade based on the results of a vocal audition, application and interview. Students commute to Harvard Square from various cities and towns throughout the greater Boston area, sometimes traveling more than an hour each way. Most students at the Choir School are Roman Catholic and many have previously attended parochial schools.

The choir has traveled over the years to sing in Chicago, Montreal, Washington, DC, and Rome. They have also been to Mexico City as well as a tour of Germany and Austria in February 2020. In 2005, the choir sang in Rome for Masses at St. Peter's Basilica and at the Church of Santa Susanna and again in 2013 before an audience with Pope Francis in St. Peter's Square and a performance in Assisi. The choir has sung at Mass on multiple occasions at the Basilica of the National Shrine in Washington, DC, most recently in January 2020. The choir has also performed at St. Patrick's Cathedral in New York City in 2012.

== Tuition ==
Tuition for the 2024-25 school year is $21,500.

== Performances and recordings ==
=== Performances ===
- With the Boston Symphony Orchestra:
  - Hector Berlioz: The Damnation of Faust at Carnegie Hall and Symphony Hall, Boston
  - Johann Sebastian Bach: St. Matthew Passion at Tanglewood
  - Gustav Mahler: Symphony No. 3 at Carnegie Hall
  - Gustav Mahler: Symphony No. 8
  - Arthur Honegger: Joan of Arc at the Stake at Tanglewood
  - Giacomo Puccini: Tosca
  - Carl Orff: Carmina Burana
- With the Opera Company of Boston at Boston Opera House:
  - Wolfgang Amadeus Mozart: The Magic Flute
- (2013) with the Boston Lyric Opera:
  - Wolfgang Amadeus Mozart: The Magic Flute
- (2014) With the Boston Symphony Orchestra:
  - Mahler: Symphony 3 at Carnegie Hall
- (2017) With the Boston Symphony Orchestra:
  - Hector Berlioz: The Damnation of Faust at Symphony Hall
- (2017) With the Boston POPS Orchestra:
  - Howard Blake: The Snowman at
- (2018) With the Boston Symphony Orchestra:
  - Leonard Bernstein: The Kaddish Symphony at Symphony Hall

=== Recordings ===
- Saint Paul Choir School Sings Advent-Christmas Choral Music | Saint Paul Choir School (1963)
  - Theodore Marier, Director. James Reid Taylor, Organist.
- A Joyous Christmas Offering | Saint Paul Choir School (1966)
  - Theodore Marier, Director. James Reid Taylor, Organist.
- Music for the Sung Liturgy in English | Saint Paul Choir School (1966)
  - Theodore Marier, Director. John Dunn, Organist.
- When in Rome | Saint Paul Choir School (1967)
  - Theodore Marier, Director. John Dunn, Organist.
- Tidings of Great Joy | Saint Paul Choir School (1970)
  - Theodore Marier, Director. John Dunn, Organist.
- Lutheran Organ Mass - Anthony Newman | Boston Archdiocesan Choir School (1973)
  - Theodore Marier, Director. John Dunn, Organist.
- Pentecost Mass - Charles Tournemire - L'Orgue Mystique, Mass for Pentecost, Op. 56, No. XXV. | Boston Archdiocesan Choir School (1976)
  - Theodore Marier, Director. Gerard Farrell, Organist.
- O Holy Night | Boston Boy Choir (1992)
  - John Dunn, Director. Timothy Hughes, Organist.
- Joyful, Joyful, We Adore Thee | Boston Boy Choir (1993)
  - John Dunn, Director. Timothy Hughes, Organist.
- Sing Noel | Boston Boy Choir (1994)
  - John Dunn, Director. Timothy Hughes, Organist.
- Wondrous Love - Celebrating Music of the Liturgical Year | Boston Boy Choir (1996)
  - John Dunn, Director. Timothy Hughes, Organist.
- On Christmas Night | Boston Boy Choir (2000)
  - John Dunn, Director. Jennifer Lester, Organist.
- The Holly and the Ivy (45th Anniversary Recording) | Boston Boy Choir
  - John Dunn, Director. Jennifer Lester, Organist.
  - Includes archived recordings from Theodore Marier.
- Christmas in Harvard Square | The Boys of St. Paul's Choir School (2014)
  - John Robinson (Organist and Choir Director)
- Ave Maria | The Boys of St. Paul's Choir School (2017)
  - John Robinson (Organist and Choir Director)
