= David Dausey =

American epidemiologist and academic administrator

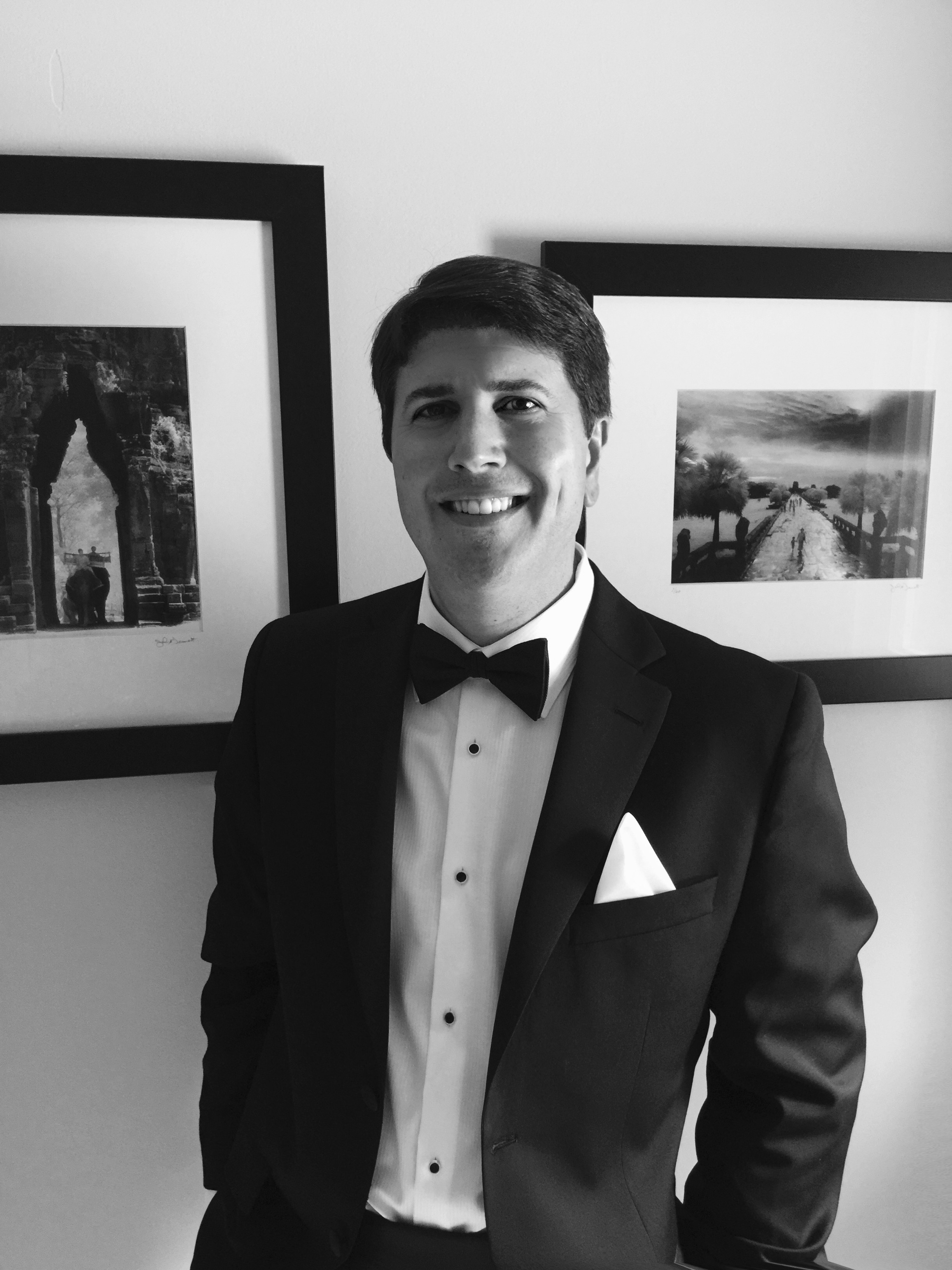
- Born: June 13, 1975 (age 51); Pittsburgh, Pennsylvania
- Education: Mercyhurst University, Yale University, University of Pennsylvania
- Scientific career
- Fields: Epidemiology, public health
- Workplaces: Duquesne University, Carnegie Mellon University, Mercyhurst University, RAND Corporation
- Doctoral advisor: Mark Schlesinger

David J. Dausey is an American epidemiologist, professor, and academic administrator who has served as the 14th president of Duquesne University since July 1, 2026. He previously served as Duquesne's executive vice president and provost and as provost of Mercyhurst University in Erie, Pennsylvania. Before joining Mercyhurst, Dausey was a professor at Carnegie Mellon University, where he holds an honorary faculty appointment as a Distinguished Service Professor. He was also a policy researcher at the RAND Corporation.

== Education ==
Dausey received a bachelor's degree in psychology from Mercyhurst University. Dausey received his master's degree in epidemiology and public health from the Yale School of Public Health and his doctoral degree (Ph.D) in epidemiology and public health from the Yale Graduate School of Arts and Sciences. While at Yale, Dausey served as a senator for the Graduate and Professional Student Senate. He received an Ed.D from the University of Pennsylvania. He completed post graduate training in higher education management and leadership at the Harvard Kennedy School and the Harvard Graduate School of Education.

== Career ==
=== Economic development ===
Dausey was the founding Chairman of the Board of the Erie Innovation District, a Limited Liability Company (LLC) designed to create jobs and stimulate economic growth in Erie, Pennsylvania. The focus of the Erie Innovation District is to incubate and accelerate businesses focused on data science and cybersecurity. The overarching plan is to turn Erie, Pennsylvania into an innovation hub for cyber. Dausey led the search team for the president and CEO for the Erie Innovation District. In September 2017, Karl Sanchack was hired to fulfill this role. Joe NeCastro, formerly the chief financial and administrative officer of Scripps Networks, replaced Dausey as chair in May 2018.

=== Epidemiology ===
Dausey was elected a fellow of the American College of Epidemiology in 2012. His research on public-health systems examined the preparedness of local health agencies to respond to disease outbreaks and other emergencies. He has appeared as a public-health commentator on television and radio outlets including CNN, the BBC, CTV, and NPR. He has also contributed opinion articles on public-health issues to USA Today, The Washington Post, the Pittsburgh Post-Gazette, and The Buffalo News.

== Academia ==
=== Academic appointments ===
Dausey began his teaching career at Yale University, where he was a teaching fellow. He later served as a clinical assistant professor at the University of Pittsburgh and as a Distinguished Service Professor of Health Policy and Management at Carnegie Mellon University. His teaching at Carnegie Mellon focused on health systems, health policy, program evaluation and epidemiology. He subsequently held a tenured full professorship in Mercyhurst University's Zurn College of Natural and Health Sciences. Dausey holds tenured faculty appointments in Duquesne University's John G. Rangos School of Health Sciences and Nasuti College of Osteopathic Medicine, as well as an honorary appointment as a Distinguished Service Professor at Carnegie Mellon.

=== Academic administration ===
Dausey began his career in academic administration as the Senior Director of Health Programs and Initiatives Carnegie Mellon University. In this capacity, he oversaw three master's degree programs, three master's degree concentrations, three joint undergraduate/graduate degree programs, and a health focused doctoral program. Dausey grew and expanded the academic programs at Carnegie Mellon focused on health by creating partnerships with community organizations. Dausey left Carnegie Mellon to join Mercyhurst University to become the Founding Chair and Professor of the Department of Public Health. Dausey later became Founding Director of the Mercyhurst Institute of Public Health. Dausey was appointed the Founding Dean of the School of Health Professions and Public Health at Mercyhurst, which eventually grew to become the Zurn College of Natural and Health Sciences.

Dausey became provost of Mercyhurst University in 2015. He left Mercyhurst in 2018 to become executive vice president and provost of Duquesne University. In November 2025, Duquesne's board of directors selected Dausey as the university's 14th president following a national search. He assumed the presidency on July 1, 2026, succeeding Ken Gormley.

=== Selected publications ===
Among Dausey's publications for the RAND Corporation are the technical reports Tests to Evaluate Public Health Disease Reporting Systems in Local Public Health Agencies (2005) and Evaluation of the Arkansas Tobacco Settlement Program: Progress from Program Inception to 2004 (2004).

== Personal life ==
Dausey was born on June 13, 1975, in Pittsburgh, Pennsylvania, to Daniel and Jody Dausey. He currently lives in Pittsburgh, Pennsylvania with his wife, Nichole, and their two boys, Daniel and Elijah. Dausey is an avid runner and was a varsity athlete while in college. He served as the captain of the Mercyhurst Cross County team from 1995 to 1997.
