= Duquesne University School of Science and Engineering =

Science and engineering school of Duquesne University

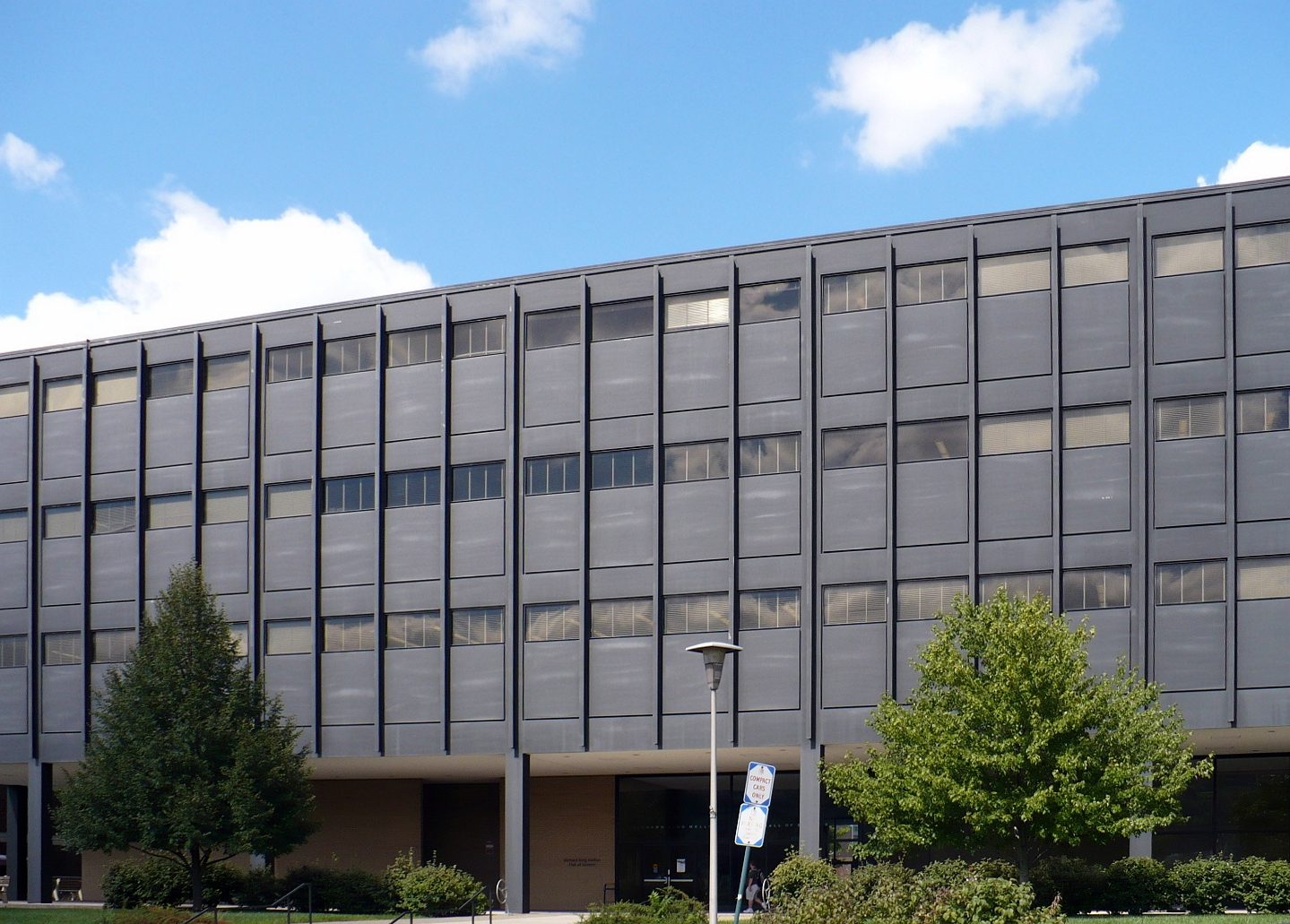
Richard King Mellon Hall of Science, the school's principal academic building

The Duquesne University School of Science and Engineering is a constituent school of Duquesne University in Pittsburgh, Pennsylvania. Established in 1994 as the Bayer School of Natural and Environmental Sciences, the school was expanded and adopted its present name following the addition of engineering, mathematics and computer science, and biomedical engineering in 2023. It offers undergraduate and graduate programs in the natural sciences, mathematics, computer science, environmental studies, forensic science, and engineering.

== History ==
The school was established in 1994 through a restructuring of Duquesne's former College of Liberal Arts and Sciences. The departments of biological sciences, chemistry and biochemistry, and physics formed the core of the new Bayer School of Natural and Environmental Sciences. The school subsequently added the Forensic Science and Law Program in 2003 and a biotechnology program in 2008.

In April 2023, Duquesne announced that the school would be expanded and renamed the School of Science and Engineering. The reorganization incorporated the university's existing biomedical engineering and mathematics and computer science programs and introduced additional engineering education. General first-year engineering coursework began in fall 2023, allowing students to begin engineering degrees at Duquesne rather than transferring to partner institutions to complete their studies.

== Academics ==
The school is organized into academic areas encompassing biological sciences, biomedical engineering, chemistry and biochemistry, civil and environmental engineering and science, forensic science and law, mathematics and computer science, mechanical engineering, and physics. It awards bachelor's, master's, and doctoral degrees. Its programs include study in biology, biochemistry, biotechnology, chemistry, computer science, data science, environmental science and management, forensic science and law, mathematics, physics, and engineering.

The school also participates in combined-degree programs with other divisions of Duquesne, including the Kline School of Law, the School of Education, and the School of Nursing.

== Facilities ==
The school is based principally in Richard King Mellon Hall of Science. Designed by Ludwig Mies van der Rohe and completed in 1968, the four-story building contains classrooms, lecture halls, laboratories, and computing facilities. It houses most of the school's academic departments as well as laboratories used by the School of Pharmacy and the Nasuti College of Osteopathic Medicine. Biomedical engineering facilities are also located in Libermann Hall.
