= RSHS =

RSHS may refer to:

Schools in Australia

- Redcliffe State High School, Redcliffe, Queensland
- Robina State High School, Robina, Queensland
- Rockhampton State High School, Wandal, Queensland
- Rossmoyne Senior High School, Rossmoyne, Western Australia

Schools in Canada

- Ross Sheppard High School, Edmonton, Alberta

Schools in the United States

- John G. Rangos School of Health Sciences, a constituent college of Duquesne University in Pittsburgh, Pennsylvania
- Reading Senior High School, Reading, Pennsylvania
- Rich South High School, Richton Park, Illinois
- Rock Springs High School, Rock Springs, Wyoming
- Roosevelt Senior High School (Washington, D.C.)
- Rockwood Summit High School, Fenton, Missouri
- Royal Sunset High School, Hayward, California

Schools in the Philippines

- Regional Science High School (various campuses)
