= UPMC Mercy =

- University of Pittsburgh Medical Center

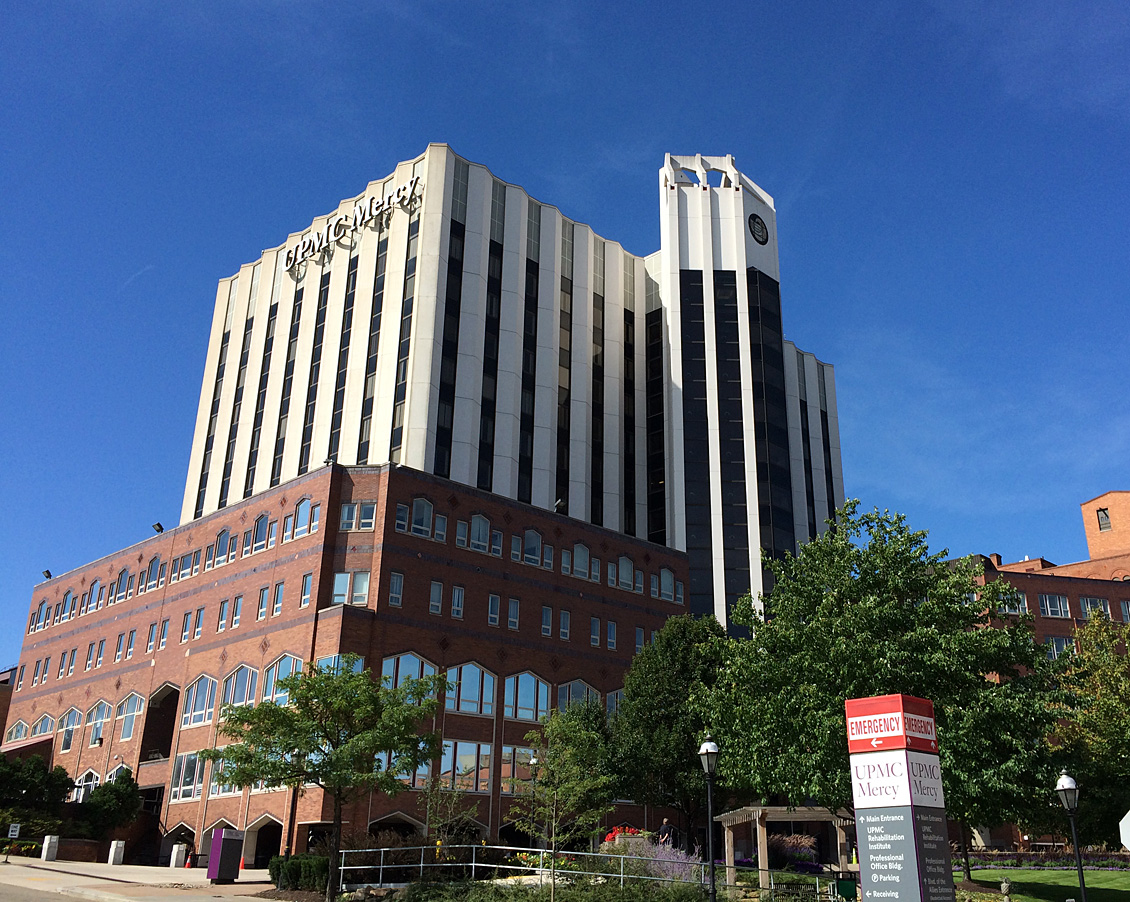
- UPMC Mercy in Pittsburgh, Pennsylvania

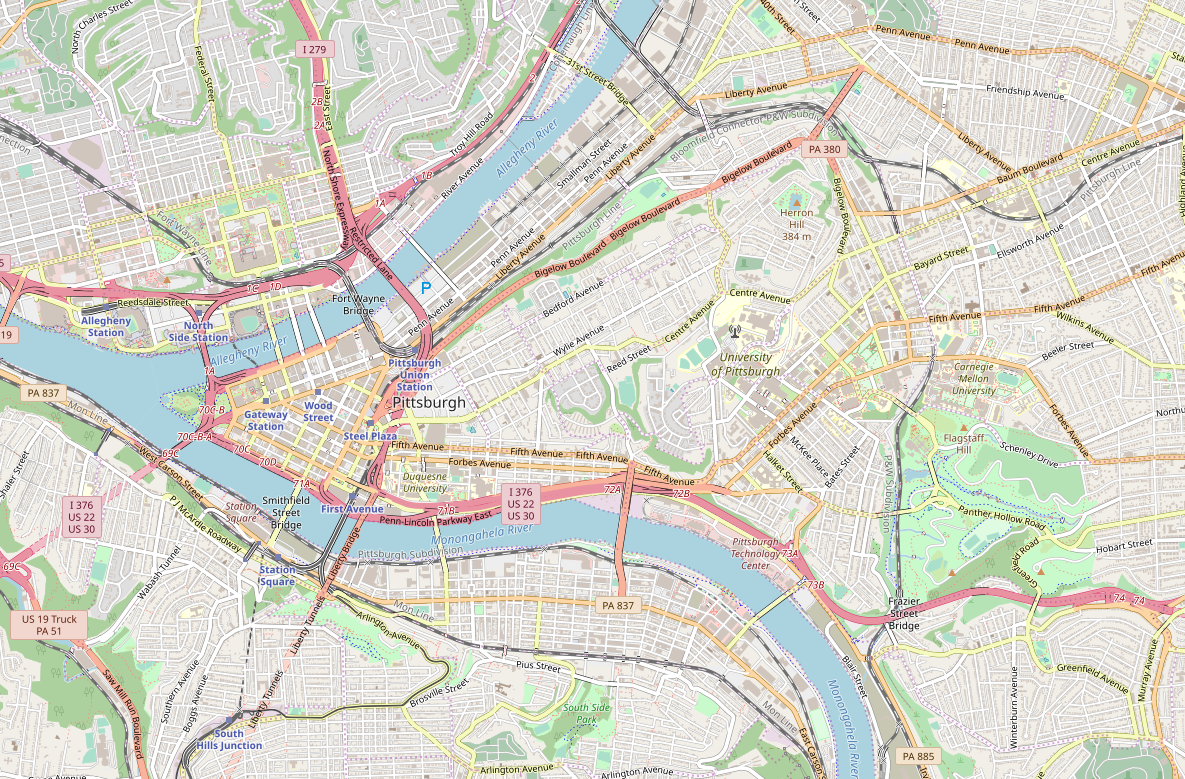
- Location of UPMC Mercy in Downtown Pittsburgh

Geography
- Location: Pittsburgh, Pennsylvania, U.S.
- Coordinates: 40.4363°N 79.9851°W

Organisation
- Type: Teaching
- Affiliated university: University of Pittsburgh School of Medicine; The Mercy Hospital School of Nursing

Services
- Emergency department: Adult Level I
- Beds: 404

Helipads
- Helipad: FAA LID: PN23
Number	Length		Surface
Number	ft	m	Surface
H1	65	20	Concrete

History
- Founded: January 1, 1847

Links
- Website: www.upmc.com/locations/hospitals/mercy

Pennsylvania Historical Marker
- Official name: Mercy Hospital
- Designated: May 27, 1994

UPMC Mercy is a main hospital facility of the University of Pittsburgh Medical Center (UPMC) and is located in the Uptown section of the city of Pittsburgh, Pennsylvania, adjacent to Duquesne University, and a few blocks from the PPG Paints Arena and downtown Pittsburgh. It is the first chartered hospital to have been founded in the city of Pittsburgh and it is also the first hospital in the world to have been established by the Sisters of Mercy. It is also the first teaching hospital in the region, accepting residents to teaching positions beginning in 1848, one year after opening its doors.

In January 2008, Mercy Hospital merged with Pittsburgh health care giant UPMC, taking on its current name UPMC Mercy. UPMC Mercy remains Pittsburgh's only Catholic hospital that provides a full breadth of specialized services.

== History ==
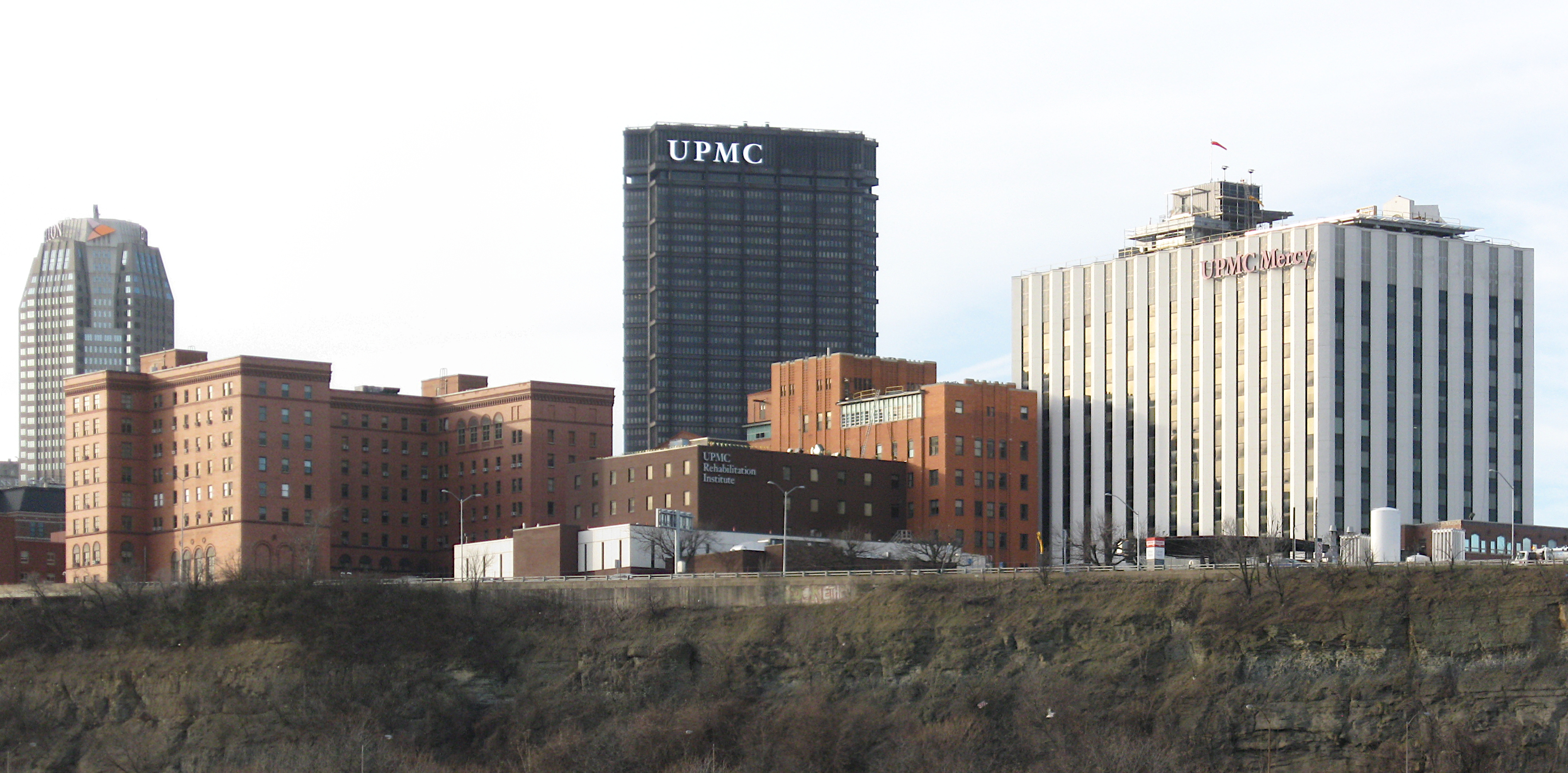
Mercy Hospital in Pittsburgh viewed from across the Monongahela River

The Sisters of Mercy, a religious congregation founded in Ireland in 1831 by Catherine McAuley, brought its stated mission of caring and compassion to the growing industrial city of Pittsburgh in 1843. Mother Frances Warde led six other sisters to the United States, where they founded the first congregation of the Sisters of Mercy in Pittsburgh. The pioneering "Seven Sisters" of Mercy opened the first permanent hospital in Pittsburgh, and the world's first Mercy Hospital, on January 1, 1847. Founded by Bishop Michael O'Connor, it began life in a temporary frame building on Penn Avenue known as Concert Hall. The hospital they established was open to all regardless of race, nationality, age, gender, or religion. Mercy established the region's first teaching hospital with resident physicians in training in 1848.

Mercy Hospital grew rapidly with Pittsburgh in the second half of the nineteenth century. To qualify for new funding sources, the hospital was incorporated, a board was established, and Thomas M. Carnegie was elected board president. The Sisters of Mercy and the physicians and nurses of Mercy Hospital continued to serve the Pittsburgh region through World War I, the worldwide epidemic of Spanish influenza, the Great Depression, and World War II. One of the most compelling examples of the hospital's service to the community occurred in 1931 when Mercy Hospital donated more than $600,000 ($12,702,407 today) worth of health care services at a time when one day in the hospital cost less than $4 ($84.68 today). That commitment to the community was demonstrated again when, in the 1960s, Mercy decided to rebuild and remain in uptown Pittsburgh, and over the next four decades, the hospital expanded, replaced facilities, and developed specialized programs and advanced technology.

In 1998, Pittsburgh Mercy Health System, Sisters of Providence Health System, and Allegany merged to form Catholic Health East.

In 2006, Catholic Health East decided to seek a strategic partner to strengthen and preserve its faith-based care in Pittsburgh and Mercy Hospital of Pittsburgh merged with UPMC to become UPMC Mercy on January 1, 2008. The hospital remains Pittsburgh's only Catholic hospital with specialized services, including the neurosciences, Level I trauma and burn services, women's health, orthopaedics, and physical medicine and rehabilitation. Catholic Health East continued to operate Pittsburgh Mercy Behavioral Health.

== Mission ==
From its inception in 1847, the hospital has welcomed and served all who are in need of its services regardless of race, nationality, age, gender or religion. UPMC Mercy continues to provide significant amounts of unreimbursed healthcare to the poor and uninsured in Pittsburgh and to the entire Western Pennsylvania region. The Mission of the hospital includes "a commitment to being a transforming, healing presence within the communities we serve".

== Core values ==
UPMC Mercy embraces the following seven "core values" that are at the heart of its daily operation:

1. Reverence for each person,
2. Community support,
3. Justice for all,
4. Commitment to those who are poor,
5. Stewardship,
6. Courage,
7. Integrity.

As a Catholic hospital, UPMC Mercy will not provide or permit medical procedures that are contrary to the teachings of the Roman Catholic Church, thus not providing some procedures available at other UPMC facilities.

== Major programs ==
UPMC Mercy Hospital is a Level I Trauma and Burn Center, a major neurosurgical center, and a major cardiovascular treatment center that also has acquired advanced technology for the diagnosis and treatment of stroke and neurovascular disorders.

Level 4A Medically Managed Inpatient Detoxification services have been offered at UPMC Mercy since January 2010, as a result of the closure of UPMC Braddock. Although both Level 4A (Medically Managed) and Level 3A (Medically Monitored) Inpatient Detox had been available on the UPMC Braddock premises, Level 3A services are not available at UPMC Mercy.

UPMC Mercy incorporates a fully accredited, 76-bed rehabilitation center for the treatment of various forms of pathology producing physical disabilities. Specialty programs include rehabilitation of people after brain injury, stroke, spinal cord injury, or limb amputation.

UPMC Mercy Hospital offers physician residency training programs in general surgery, internal medicine, podiatry, physical medicine and rehabilitation, and pharmacy.

In 2023, the UPMC Vision Institute moved from UPMC Presbyterian to the new Mercy Pavilion, providing routine and emergency ophthalmology and advanced eye related services.

UPMC Mercy Hospital began hosting clinical rotations from the Duquesne University Nasuti College of Osteopathic Medicine in June of 2026.

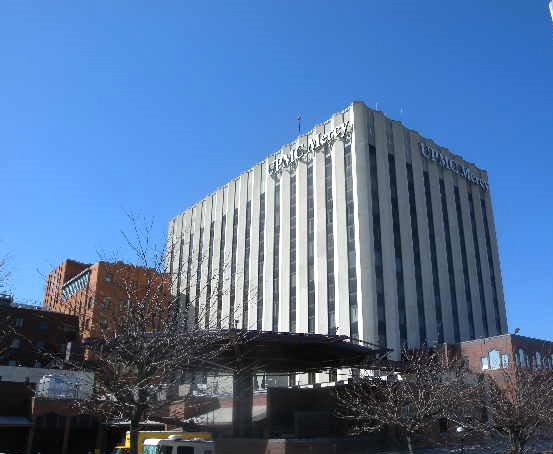
Helipad at UPMC Mercy

== Internal Medicine Residency Program ==
Internal medicine residency program is the largest residency program of the institution, with more than 60 first, second and third year categorical residents. The program director is Dr. Katherine M Foust. The program includes rotations at UPMC Mercy Hospital and the Mercy Health Center.

== Patients ==
- Ben Roethlisberger is a past patient. In a statement released on June 15, 2006 through the Pittsburgh Steelers organization following his treatment at Mercy Hospital for injuries sustained in a motorcycle accident in downtown Pittsburgh on June 12, 2006, Mr. Roethlisberger included the following acknowledgment: "The physicians and support staff at Mercy Hospital were simply amazing, and I will forever be grateful for their caring treatment."
- In March 1983, Pittsburgh Penguins coach and general manager Pittsburgh Hornets legend Baz Bastien was rushed to the hospital after crashing into a motorcycle on Interstate 376 in suburban Greentree, Pennsylvania.

== Gallery ==
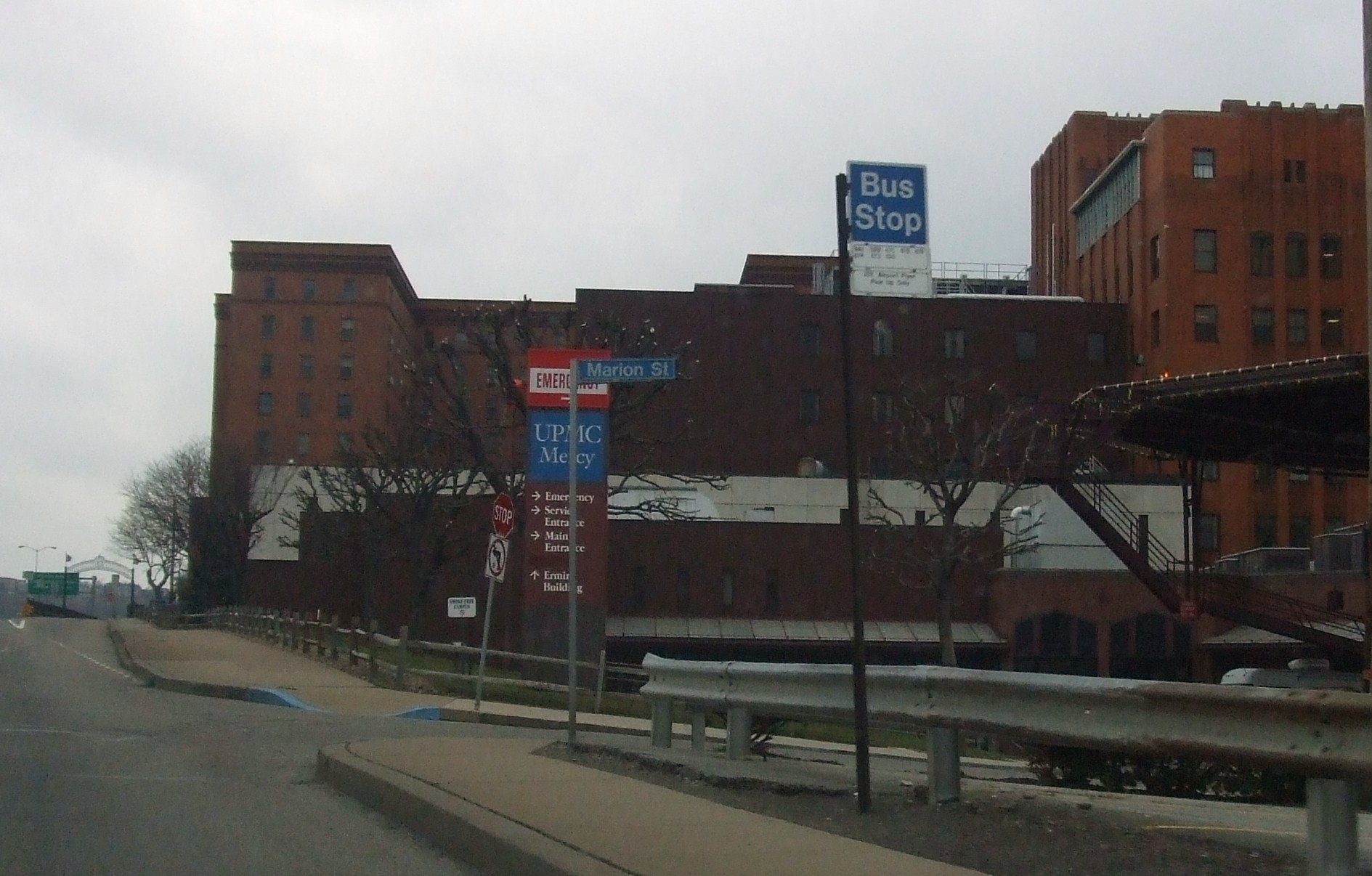
This picture was taken the day the hospital was renamed from "Mercy Hospital of Pittsburgh" to "UPMC Mercy". The hospital helipad is visible to the right, and the entrance to Duquesne University is visible to the far left. The MacLachlan Wing, an 8 floor high-rise is on the right.

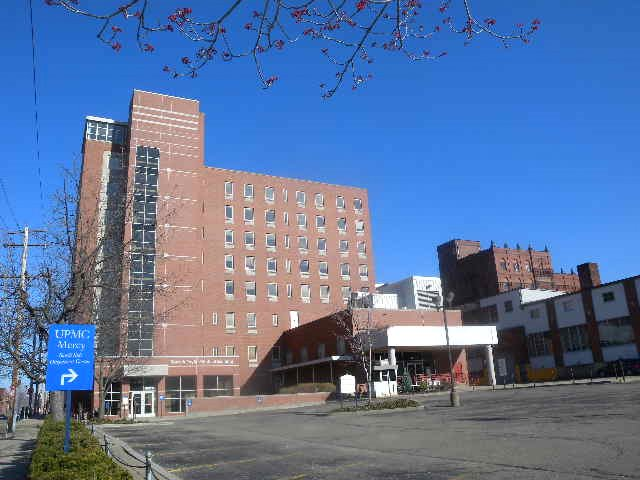
Looking east at UPMC Mercy Orthopedic and Rehabilitation building on a sunny late afternoon.

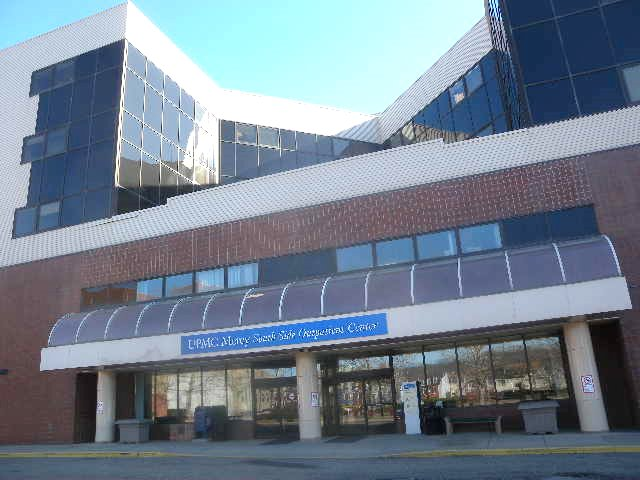
Looking south at outpatient center on a sunny late afternoon.

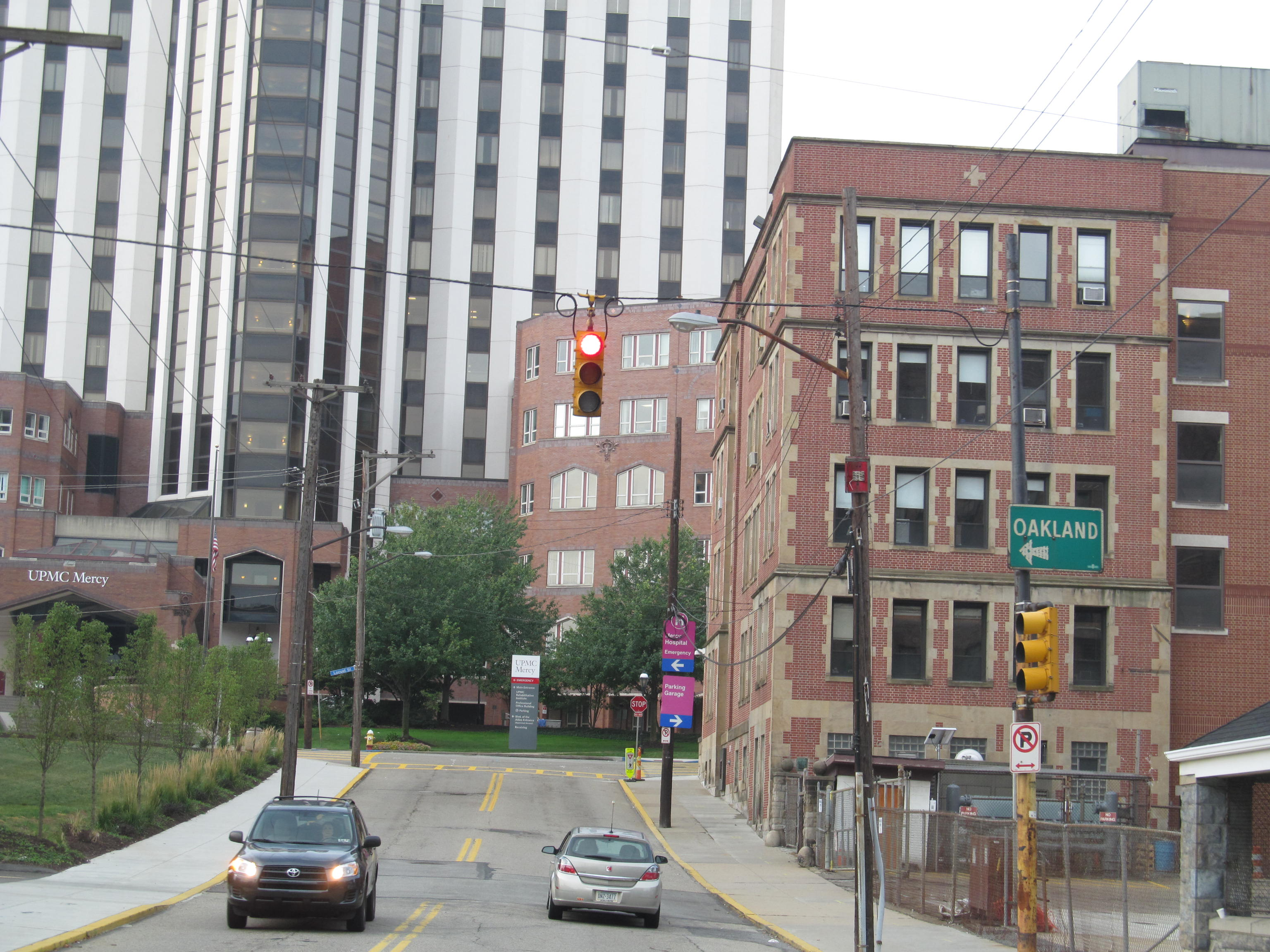

== See also ==
- UPMC Mercy South Side Outpatient Center
- List of the oldest hospitals in the United States
