= The Duquesne Duke =

Campus newspaper of Duquesne University

- The front page of The Duquesne Duke on March 22, 2007
- Type: Weekly student newspaper
- Format: Broadsheet and Website
- Owner: Duquesne University
- Founded: March 5, 1925
- Headquarters: Pittsburgh, Pennsylvania
- Website: duquesneduke.org

The Duquesne Duke is the campus newspaper of Duquesne University.

The Duke has been in operation since March 5, 1925. Written and edited by students, it is published every Thursday during the academic year, excluding exam periods and holidays. The paper provides a mix of campus news, opinions, sports, arts & entertainment, features, editorials, and advertisements. The Duke reports a circulation of approximately 3,000 newspapers every week to upwards of 10,000 undergraduate and graduate students in the Pittsburgh metropolitan area. Online, The Duke website has averaged over 15,000 views per month since August 2015.

== History ==
The paper was first published in 1925 and ran until 1942, when WWII forced it to pause publication until the war's end. The Duke resumed in 1949 and still publishes, in print and online, every Tuesday.

== Controversies ==
In the October 22, 2015 edition, a Staff Editorial detailed comments then-Duquesne University President Charles Dougherty made at a faculty town hall meeting. The article reported that Dougherty accused students who live off-campus as "liv[ing] a libertine lifestyle" and described their situation as "mardi gras." The comments set off a fire-storm in the campus community and received coverage from national outlets such as The Pittsburgh Post-Gazette, The Chronicle of Higher Education, the Associated Press and others.

A news article published in the March 29, 2017 edition highlighted concern from the Duquesne LGBTQ community over the proposed addition of a Chick-fil-A Express on campus. Donald Trump Jr. mocked the upset Duquesne students on Twitter saying they were "#triggered." Further controversy developed when during an April 13, 2017 segment of "Fox & Friends," anchor Ainsley Earhardt appeared to plagiarize The Duke's reporting. The Society of Professional Journalists reported on Fox New's plagiarism, saying it "violates a core part of SPJ’s Code of Ethics," and that "Fox News didn’t practice ethical journalism standards. To do this to college students seem [sic] even more wrong.”

Reporting from The Duke again received national attention in September 2017. After a graph detailing the Student Government Association's budget was to be run in the paper, the SGA threatened to block the printing of the information. After The Duke editorial staff refused SGA requests, the SGA filed for prior restraint with Duquesne University's Publication Board. The SGA request was denied and the paper printed the budgetary information. The incident received national coverage from the SPLC and in Politico's Morning Media newsletter.
