= Duquesne University =

Private Catholic university in Pittsburgh, Pennsylvania

Duquesne University of the Holy Spirit
- Former name: Pittsburgh Catholic College of the Holy Ghost (1878–1911)
- Motto: Spiritus est qui vivificat
- Motto in English: "It is the Spirit that gives life"
- Type: Private research university
- Established: October 1, 1878; 148 years ago
- Founder: Joseph Strub
- Accreditation: MSCHE
- Religious affiliation: Catholic (Spiritan)
- Academic affiliations: ACCU; CIC
- Endowment: $739.9 million (2025)
- Chair: Diane S. Hupp
- Chancellor: Kenneth G. Gormley
- President: David J. Dausey
- Students: 8,294 (fall 2025)
- Undergraduates: 5,406 (fall 2025)
- Postgraduates: 2,888 (fall 2025)
- Location: Pittsburgh, Pennsylvania, United States; 40°26′10″N 79°59′35″W
- Campus: 49 acres (20 ha); Large city; Other campus: Rome, Italy
- Student newspaper: The Duquesne Duke
- Colors: Red and blue
- Nickname: Dukes
- Sporting affiliations: NCAA Division I – A-10; NEC
- Mascot: The Duke
- Website: www.duq.edu

Duquesne University of the Holy Spirit (/duːˈkeɪn/ dew-KAYN), commonly shortened to Duquesne University, is a private Catholic research university in Pittsburgh, Pennsylvania, United States. Members of the Congregation of the Holy Spirit, or Spiritans, founded the institution in 1878 as the Pittsburgh Catholic College of the Holy Ghost. It moved to its present site on the Bluff in 1885 and became a university in 1911. The university was named for Michel-Ange Duquesne de Menneville, an eighteenth-century governor general of New France.

Duquesne's main campus occupies 49 acres (20 ha) and contains 46 buildings. The university also operates an Italian campus in Rome and a study abroad center at University College Dublin in Ireland. In fall 2025, Duquesne enrolled 8,294 students and offered 214 undergraduate, graduate, and postgraduate programs through ten schools. It is the only Spiritan institution of higher education in the United States.

Duquesne is classified as "Research 2: High Research Spending and Doctorate Production" in the Carnegie Classification of Institutions of Higher Education. Its athletic teams, the Duquesne Dukes, compete in NCAA Division I, principally in the Atlantic 10 Conference. The men's basketball team won the National Invitation Tournament in 1955 and, in 2024, made its first appearance in the NCAA Division I men's basketball tournament since 1977 and recorded its first tournament victory since 1969.

== History ==
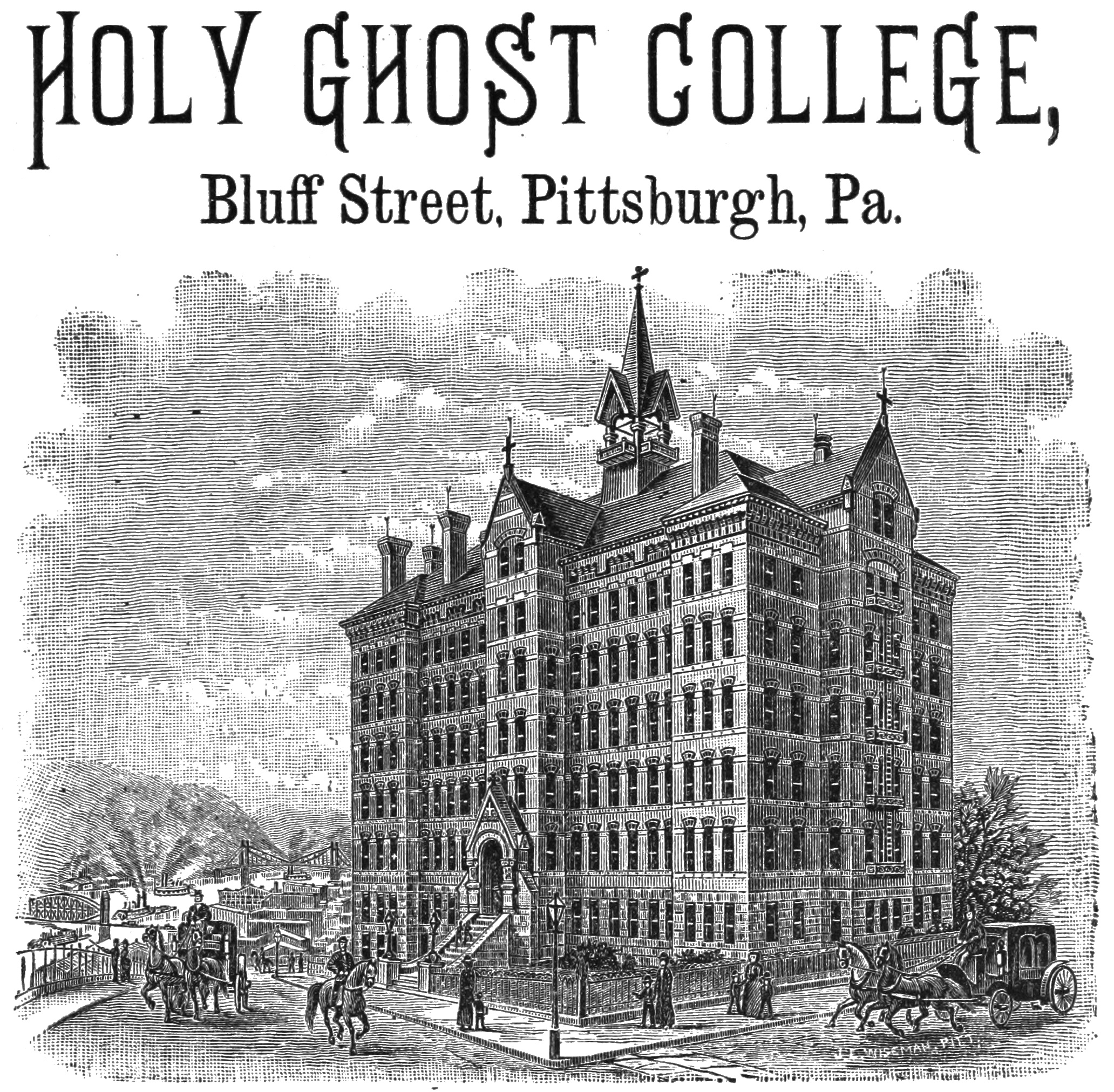
Holy Ghost College on the Bluff in 1888, three years after the completion of Old Main.

=== Founding and early growth ===
The Pittsburgh Catholic College of the Holy Ghost was founded on October 1, 1878, by Joseph Strub and other Spiritans who had left Germany during Otto von Bismarck's Kulturkampf. The college opened with 40 students and six faculty members in rented rooms above a bakery on Wylie Avenue in Pittsburgh's Hill District. It received a state charter in 1882.

As enrollment increased, the college moved from Wylie Avenue to Boyd's Hill, later known as the Bluff. Its five-story administration building, subsequently called Old Main, was completed in 1885 and remains in use. During the presidency of Martin Hehir, the institution developed from a small college into a university with professional and graduate programs. On May 27, 1911, it was renamed Duquesne University of the Holy Ghost and became Pennsylvania's first Catholic institution to attain university status. The School of Law was established the same year. Duquesne awarded its first degree to a woman, Sister M. Fides of the Sisters of Mercy, in 1913 and established a graduate school in 1914.

Schools of business, pharmacy, music, education, and nursing were established between 1913 and 1937, broadening the university's work beyond its original liberal arts curriculum. Canevin Hall, completed during the 1920s, was the first campus building constructed solely for academic use. Expansion slowed during the Great Depression, and the demands of World War II reduced enrollment from approximately 3,100 in 1940 to about 1,000 during the summer of 1944. The arrival of veterans after the war reversed the decline, however, and by 1949, enrollment had risen to approximately 5,500.

=== Postwar expansion and financial crisis ===
Assumption Hall, Duquesne's first student residence, opened in 1954. During the following two decades, the university began to change from a predominantly commuter institution into a larger residential campus. Under president Henry J. McAnulty, Duquesne constructed St. Martin Hall, St. Ann Hall, Duquesne Towers, the student union, and Richard King Mellon Hall of Science, designed by Ludwig Mies van der Rohe. Vickroy Street was closed to traffic and converted into the Academic Walk through the center of campus. By 1968, enrollment had reached 7,428.

Duquesne was also one of the centers associated with the early Catholic Charismatic Renewal. A retreat attended by university faculty members and students in February 1967 became an important event in the movement's development.

The rapid physical expansion was followed by severe financial strain. Construction costs, including those of Duquesne Towers and College Hall, added to the university's debt, while the conversion of the University of Pittsburgh into a state-related institution reduced tuition there and intensified local competition. By December 1969, Duquesne had approximately $50,000 in available funds against nearly $1.4 million in payroll and construction obligations. On April 21, 1970, McAnulty canceled classes and addressed the student body, presenting a large tuition increase and the possible closure of the university as the available alternatives. Student Government Association president Rita Ferko and other student leaders responded by proposing a fundraising campaign called the Third Alternative. The campaign set a goal of $1 million and drew approximately 2,000 student volunteers. Among its activities was a 94.6-mile (152.2 km) march by 12 students from Altoona to Pittsburgh, a distance chosen to represent the length of one million one-dollar bills laid end to end. The march concluded in Market Square with approximately 1,000 students participating. The campaign ultimately raised nearly $600,000, helping the university remain open until its finances stabilized in 1973.

Duquesne resumed construction after the crisis. Gumberg Library opened in 1978 in a former paper mill and parking garage. During the 1980s, the university expanded the School of Law and constructed the A. J. Palumbo Center, completed in 1988. John E. Murray Jr., who became Duquesne's first lay president, oversaw a further broadening of its professional programs. Between 1990 and 2001, the university opened the John G. Rangos Sr. School of Health Sciences, the Bayer School of Natural and Environmental Sciences, and the School of Leadership and Professional Advancement.

=== Modern era ===
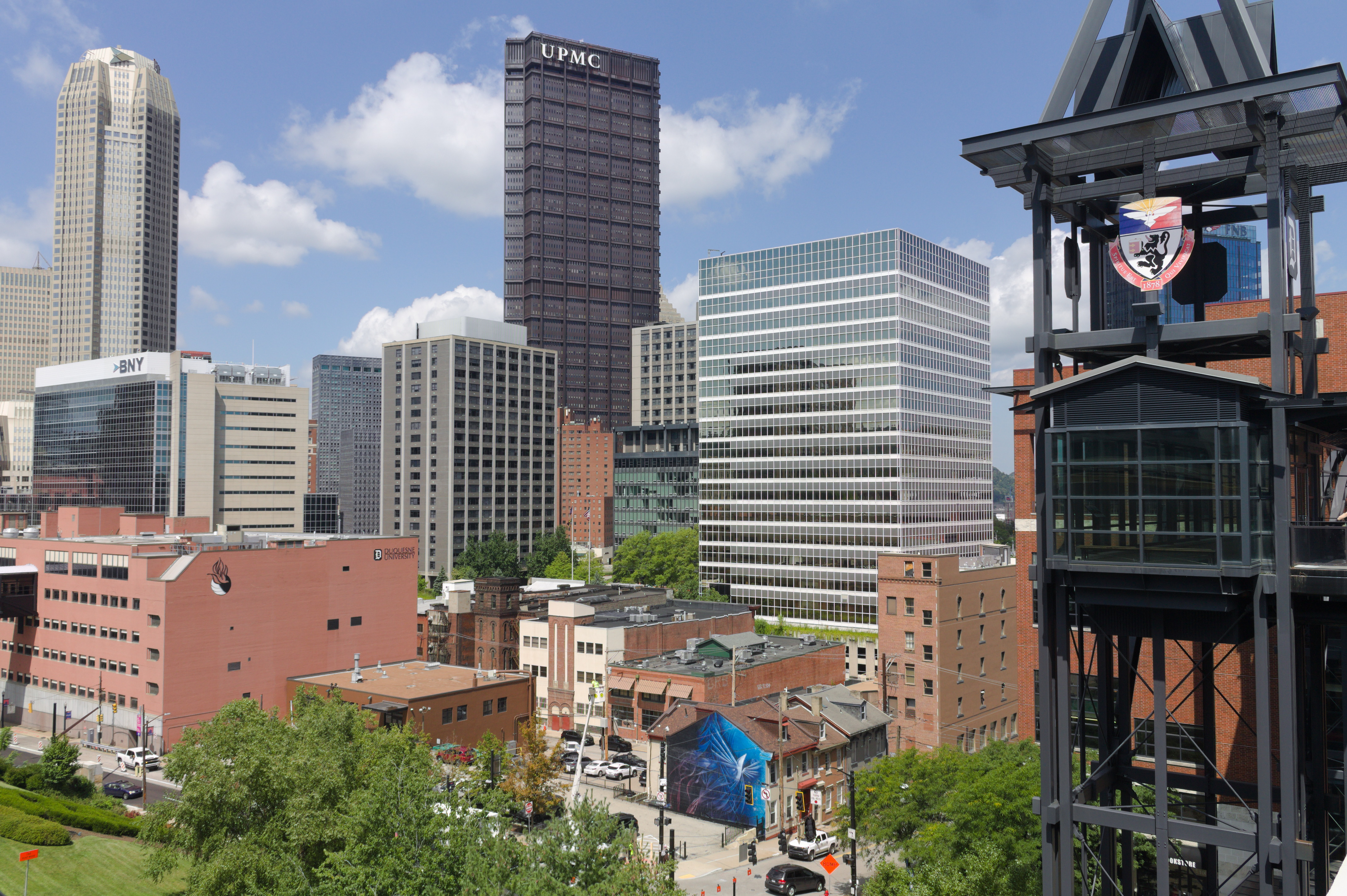
Fisher Hall and the Sklar Skywalk leading to the Power Center along Duquesne University's Fifth and Forbes corridor.

During the early twenty-first century, Duquesne extended its campus eastward along Forbes and Fifth avenues. The Power Center, a mixed-use recreation and meeting facility, opened in 2008 and connected the older Bluff campus more directly with Forbes Avenue.

In 2012, a group of adjunct faculty members voted to be represented by the United Steelworkers. Duquesne declined to recognize the union, arguing that federal labor-board jurisdiction over faculty at a religious university would interfere with its Catholic and Spiritan identity. The National Labor Relations Board subsequently ordered the university to bargain with the union, but in 2020 the United States Court of Appeals for the District of Columbia Circuit held that the board lacked jurisdiction over Duquesne and denied enforcement of the order.

In 2022, alumnus and lawyer Thomas R. Kline gave the university $50 million, then the largest donation in its history, and the School of Law was renamed for him. The university subsequently reorganized the Bayer School of Natural and Environmental Sciences as the School of Science and Engineering. Undergraduate programs in mechanical engineering, environmental and energy engineering, systems engineering, and engineering physics began in 2024.

Duquesne announced plans to establish an osteopathic medical school in 2019, extending the university's professional education into medicine. A new building on Forbes Avenue opened in January 2024, and the school enrolled its inaugural class of 85 students in July. The school was named the Nasuti College of Osteopathic Medicine in October 2025 following a gift from Jim and Celeste Nasuti.

The university's eastward expansion also included McGinley Hall, an 11-story residence building containing 556 beds that opened on Forbes Avenue in 2024. On July 1, 2026, David J. Dausey became Duquesne's fourteenth president, succeeding Ken Gormley, who became university chancellor.

== Campus ==
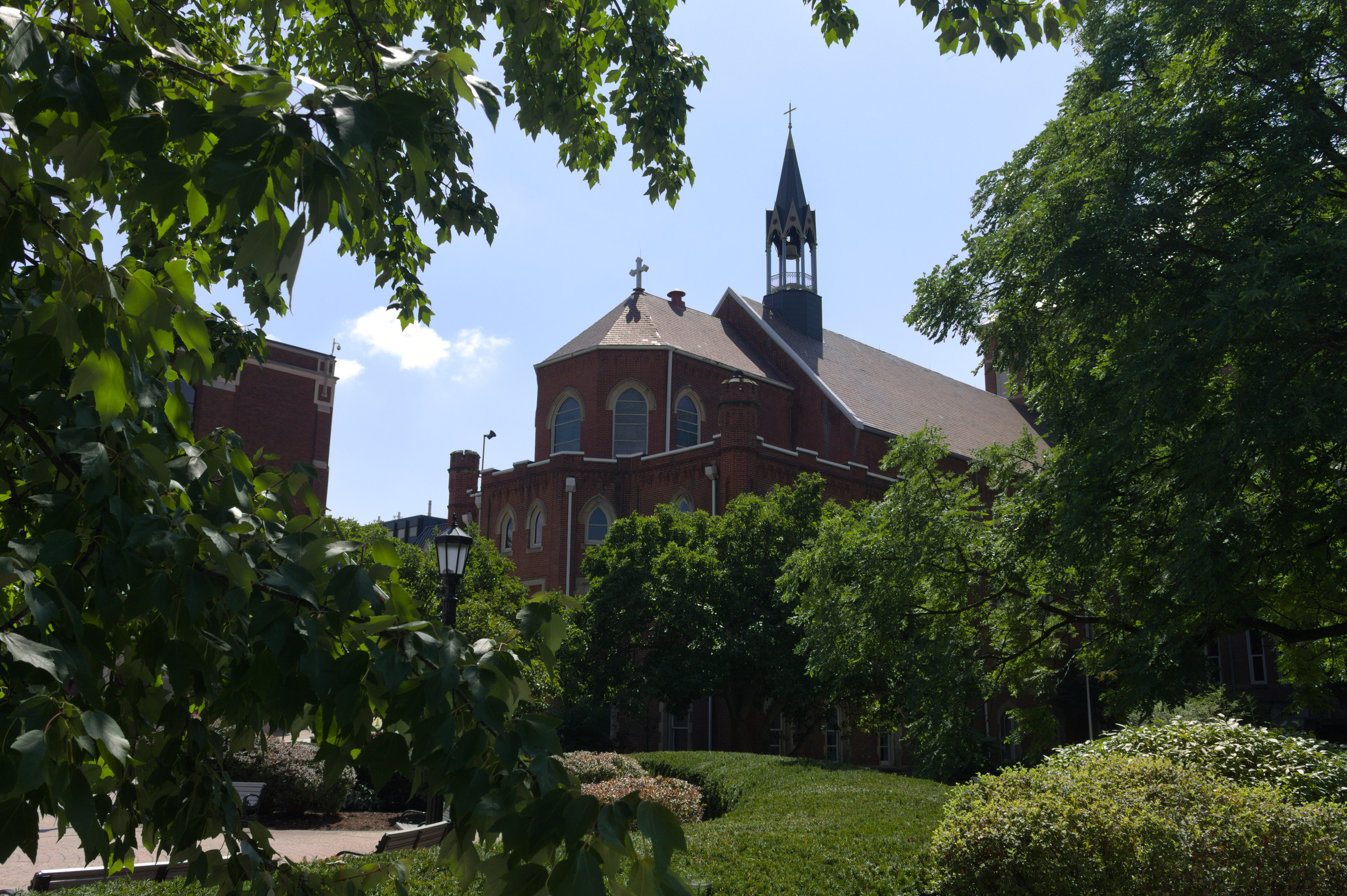
The Chapel of the Holy Spirit was dedicated in February 1895.

=== Pittsburgh campus ===
Duquesne's main campus occupies 49 acres (20 ha) on the Bluff, a plateau overlooking the Monongahela River between Pittsburgh's Uptown and Downtown districts. The university community often refers to its hilltop campus as "the Bluff" or "our Bluff." Old Main and its chapel stand near Canevin Hall, the School of Pharmacy Building (formerly the Bayer Learning Center), and Richard King Mellon Hall of Science, the latter designed by Ludwig Mies van der Rohe.

The center of the campus is organized around Academic Walk, a pedestrian route created when Vickroy Street was closed to traffic during the postwar expansion. It links many of the principal academic buildings with Old Main, the student union, and the residence halls. Much of the present campus took shape between 1950 and 1980, when Duquesne added academic buildings, student residences, recreational facilities, and the library while developing from a largely commuter institution into a residential university.

Later construction extended university property eastward from the older Bluff campus along Forbes and Fifth avenues. The Power Center, which opened on Forbes Avenue in 2008, contains recreation, meeting, dining, and retail facilities and provides a prominent entrance to the campus from Uptown. Across Forbes Avenue, the building constructed for the osteopathic medical school opened in January 2024. The 81,584-square-foot (7,579.4 m^{2}) facility contains classrooms, laboratories, clinical-training areas, and simulation spaces. McGinley Hall, an 11-story residence building that opened nearby later that year, provides apartment-style housing for upper-level and graduate students.

=== International campuses and programs ===
Outside Pittsburgh, Duquesne operates its Italian Campus in Rome. Students live at the campus and take Duquesne courses during semester and summer programs. The Rome program, which has operated for more than two decades, combines classroom instruction with educational travel and study in the city. Duquesne also maintains the Duquesne in Dublin center at University College Dublin. Unlike the Rome campus, the Dublin program is situated within a host university. Participants live on the UCD campus and enroll in UCD courses, with additional instruction and support provided through the Duquesne center. The university also sponsors faculty-led programs and approves study through partner institutions in other countries.

== Academics ==
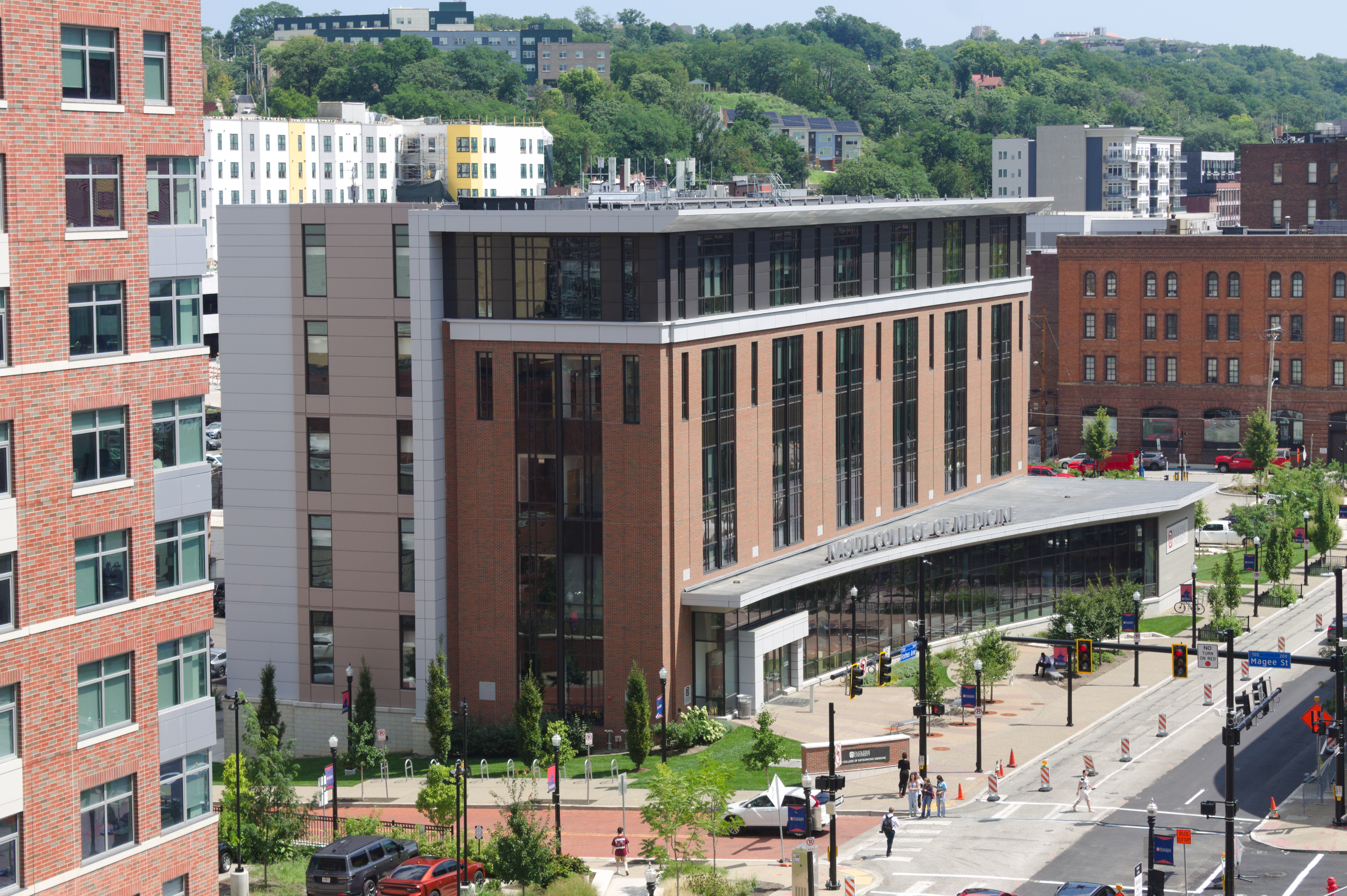
The Nasuti College of Osteopathic Medicine is the newest constituent college of the university.

Duquesne is accredited by the Middle States Commission on Higher Education. It offered 214 undergraduate, graduate, and postgraduate programs as of January 2025. The university is organized into ten schools, listed below by the year in which each school or its institutional predecessor was established:

- McAnulty College and Graduate School of Liberal Arts (1878)
- Thomas R. Kline School of Law of Duquesne University (1911)
- Palumbo–Donahue School of Business (1913)
- School of Pharmacy (1925)
- Mary Pappert School of Music (1926)
- School of Education (1929)
- School of Nursing (1937)
- John G. Rangos Sr. School of Health Sciences (1990)
- School of Science and Engineering (1994; established as the Bayer School of Natural and Environmental Sciences and reorganized under its present name in 2023)
- Nasuti College of Osteopathic Medicine (2024)

Under the 2025 Carnegie classification system, Duquesne is designated "Research 2: High Research Spending and Doctorate Production" and is placed in the "Professions-focused Undergraduate/Graduate-Doctorate Medium" institutional category.

=== Research and community engagement ===
Duquesne conducts interdisciplinary research and instruction through more than 30 academic centers and institutes, with work in fields including health ethics, technology and law, integrative health, phenomenology, environmental research, and community-engaged teaching.

The university received the Carnegie Elective Classification for Community Engagement in 2008 and was reclassified in 2015 and 2024. The classification recognizes the integration of community partnerships with teaching, research, and institutional practices. Duquesne's 2024 application documented work in health, education, legal access, and economic development. Programs operated through the Center for Integrative Health have used community health workers based in neighborhood organizations to provide screenings and connect residents with health care and social services in Pittsburgh and Clairton.

== Student life ==
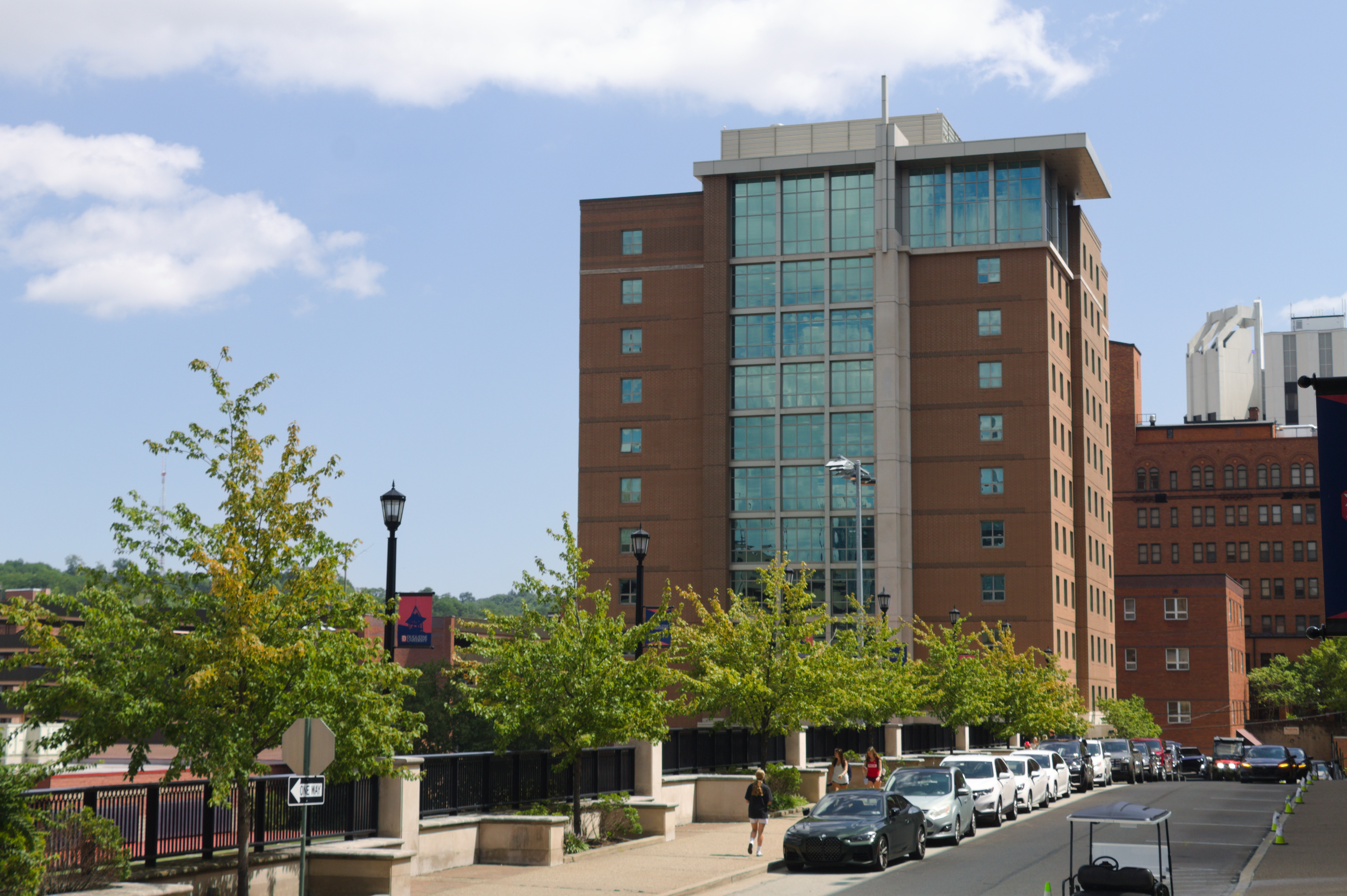
Des Places Hall opened in 2012 and offers suite-style rooms for the university Honors College.

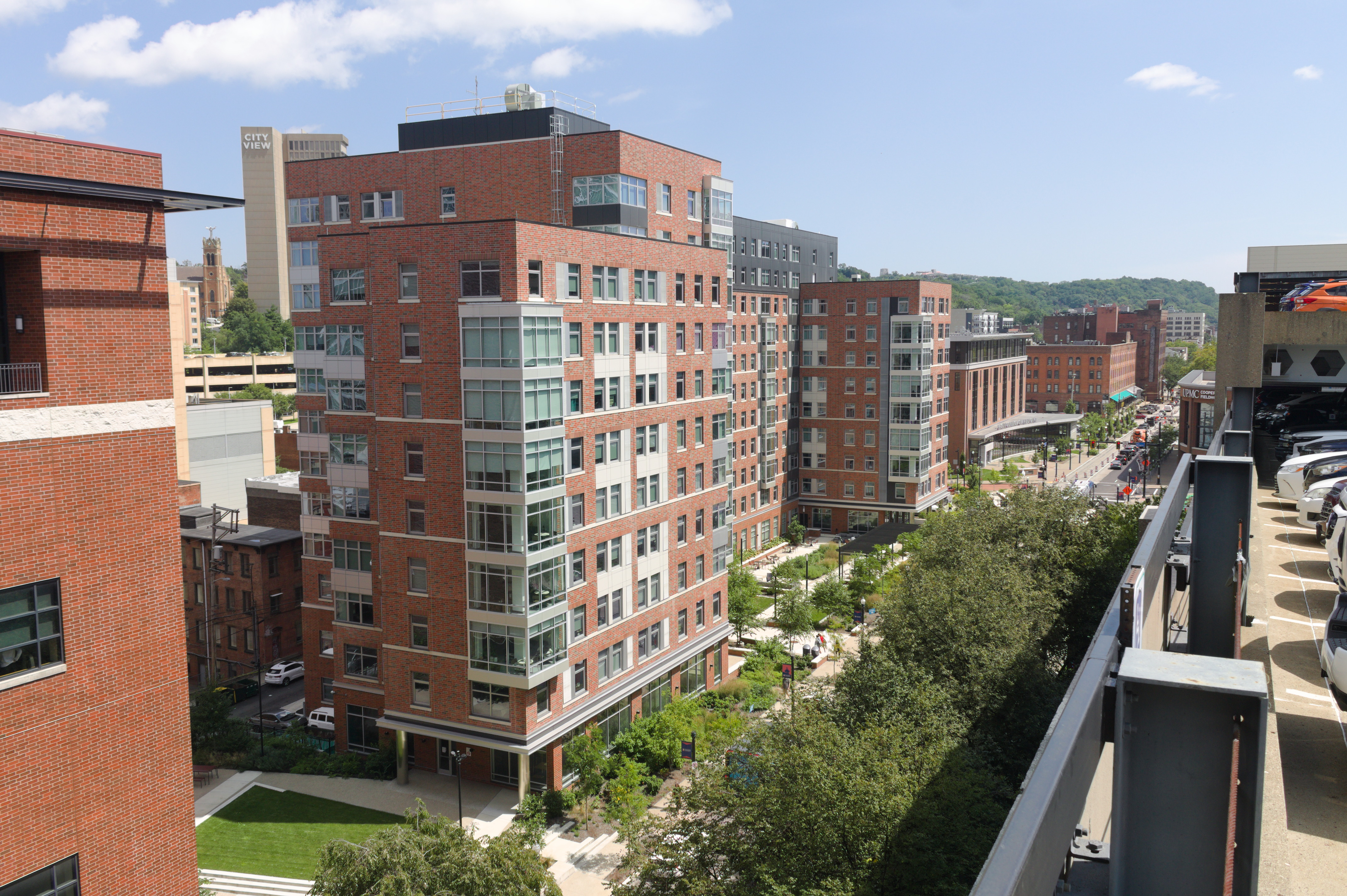
McGinley Hall, which opened in 2024 as part of Duquesne's expansion along Forbes Avenue.

=== Housing and commuter life ===
Duquesne reported a student-housing capacity of 3,810 in fall 2025, including affiliated housing. About two-thirds of its full-time undergraduate students live on campus. First- and second-year students are required to reside in university housing or with a parent or guardian unless granted an exemption.

Housing ranges from traditional rooms in Assumption Hall, St. Ann Hall, Vickroy Hall, and Duquesne Towers to suites in Des Places Hall and apartment-style accommodations in Brottier Hall, St. Martin Hall, and McGinley Hall. McGinley Hall, opened in 2024 through a public-private partnership, primarily houses juniors, seniors, and graduate students.

Duquesne also retains a substantial commuter population. Commuter Affairs operates a center in the Duquesne Union with study, dining, and lounge facilities and sponsors programs for students who travel to campus.

=== Organizations and student media ===
Duquesne recognizes more than 300 student organizations, including student-government, service, cultural, professional, religious, recreational, media, and fraternity and sorority groups. The Student Government Association represents undergraduate students in dealings with the university administration. Greek-letter organizations include social fraternities and sororities, professional fraternities, and academic honor societies.

The student newspaper, The Duquesne Duke, first appeared on March 5, 1925. Publication was suspended during World War II and resumed in 1949. Other student media include WDSR radio, Duquesne Student Television, the literary journal :Lexicon, the scientific research journal The D.U.Quark, and the yearbook L'Esprit du Duc.

=== Performing arts ===
Duquesne's Red Masquers are the oldest amateur theatre company in the city of Pittsburgh. They trace their origins to dramatic instruction offered at Duquesne during the late nineteenth century and have performed under their present name since 1914. The company is open to students from all academic programs and performs in the Genesius Theater. Other student theater organizations include Spotlight Musical Theater and the Medieval and Renaissance Players.

The Tamburitzans, a touring folk music and dance ensemble, were associated with Duquesne from 1937 until 2016. The group became an independent nonprofit organization in 2016 and began accepting students from other Pittsburgh-area institutions.

=== Traditions, ministry, and service ===
Recurring university events include Homecoming and Spirit Week, the Fall Carnival, the Night of Lights, the Christmas Ball, Founders Week, and the Festival on the Bluff. Night of Lights marks the beginning of the university's Christmas season with the illumination of the campus, carols, and a community dinner, while Founders Week commemorates Duquesne's Spiritan origins.

Spiritan Campus Ministry organizes Catholic worship, faith-sharing programs, interfaith support, social outreach, and short-term Spiritan Mission Experiences. Its programs are open to members of the university community of any religious affiliation. The university reports that approximately 8,000 students, faculty members, and staff participate in volunteer activities each year.

== Athletics ==
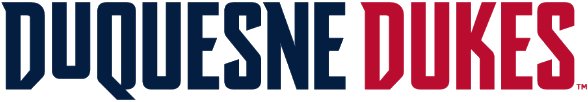
The Duquesne athletics wordmark.

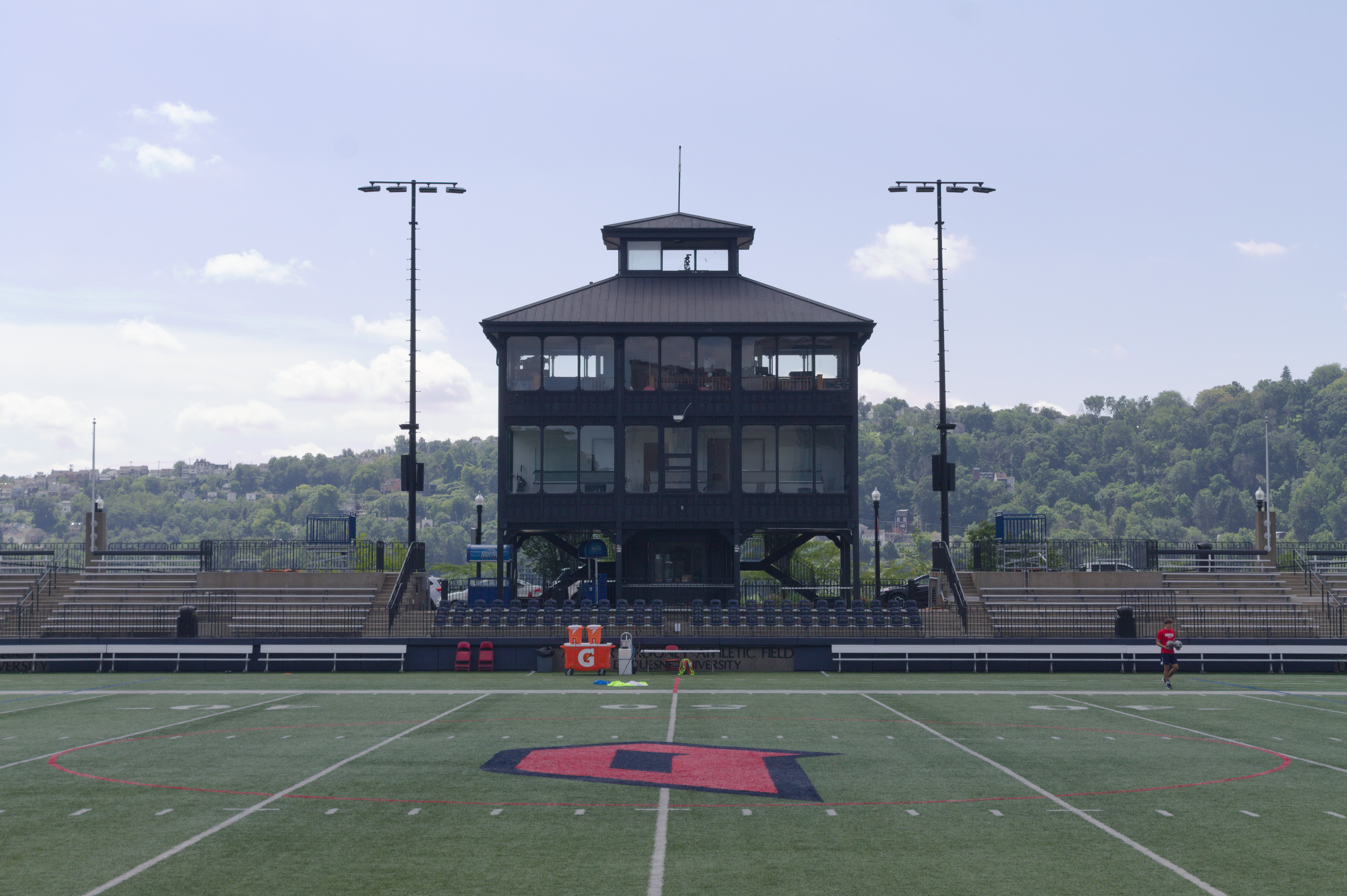
The Beard Press Box at Rooney Field, which hosts the university's football, soccer, and lacrosse teams.

Duquesne sponsors 20 varsity teams in NCAA Division I: six men's teams and fourteen women's teams. Most compete in the Atlantic 10 Conference. Football competes in the NCAA Division I Football Championship Subdivision and, with women's bowling, is a member of the Northeast Conference. Women's acrobatics and tumbling competes through the National Collegiate Acrobatics and Tumbling Association, while women's triathlon participates in competitions administered by USA Triathlon.

The men's and women's basketball teams and the women's volleyball team play at UPMC Cooper Fieldhouse, which opened in its present form in 2021 on the site of the former A. J. Palumbo Center. The arena is named for Duquesne alumnus Chuck Cooper. Football, soccer, and lacrosse use Arthur J. Rooney Athletic Field, named for Duquesne alumnus and Pittsburgh Steelers founder Art Rooney. Its completion in 1993 allowed Duquesne to play football on campus for the first time since 1929.

=== Men's basketball ===
Duquesne's men's basketball program rose to national prominence during the 1940s and 1950s and played a role in the racial integration of college basketball. Cooper joined the team in 1946. When the University of Tennessee refused to play a scheduled game if Cooper took the court, Duquesne declined to remove him from its lineup and accepted a forfeit. Cooper captained the Dukes and, in 1950, became the first Black player selected in an NBA draft.

The 1954 team reached the final of the National Invitation Tournament. Its starting lineup included an all-Black frontcourt of Dick Ricketts, Fletcher Johnson, and Sihugo Green, together with Jewish guards Sid Dambrot and Mickey Winograd. The following year, Duquesne defeated Louisville, Cincinnati, and Dayton at Madison Square Garden to win the 1955 NIT, the university's first national team championship.

The Dukes continued to make periodic NCAA tournament appearances through 1977, when the team was led by Norm Nixon, but did not return to the tournament for 47 years. In 2024, under head coach Keith Dambrot, Duquesne won four games in five days to capture the Atlantic 10 tournament championship. The team defeated BYU in the first round of the NCAA tournament, its first victory in the tournament since 1969.

=== Football ===
Duquesne first fielded a football team in the nineteenth century and competed as a major college program during the 1930s and 1940s. The 1936 team, coached by John "Clipper" Smith, defeated Mississippi State 13–12 in the 1937 Orange Bowl. A fourth-quarter halfback pass from Boyd Brumbaugh to Ernie Hefferle supplied the winning touchdown.

The university discontinued football after the 1950 season. Students revived it as a club sport in 1969, and the team returned to varsity competition in 1979 before entering Division I-AA, now the Football Championship Subdivision, in 1993. Duquesne joined the Northeast Conference in 2008. Between 2011 and 2024, the Dukes won or shared seven conference championships, a Northeast Conference record, and qualified for the FCS playoffs in 2015, 2018, and 2023. The 2018 team recorded the program's first FCS playoff victory.

=== Other varsity sports ===
Duquesne's women's volleyball team won the Atlantic 10 regular-season and tournament championships in 2013 and made the program's first NCAA tournament appearance that year. The women's basketball team received its first NCAA tournament invitation in 2016.

The university expanded its women's varsity program in the 2020s. Women's triathlon began competition in 2023, followed by women's golf and acrobatics and tumbling in 2024, increasing the total number of varsity teams to twenty.

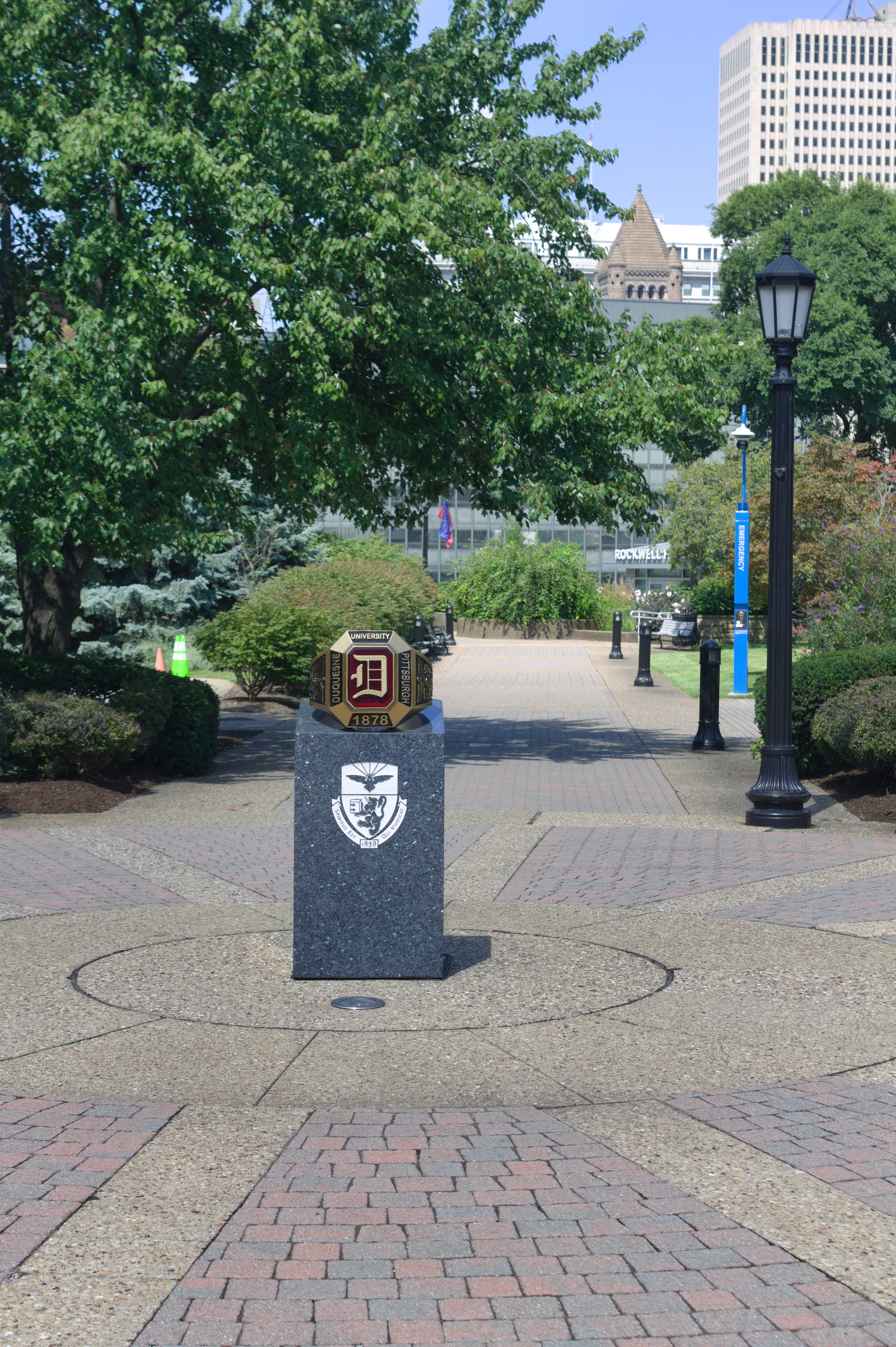
The Duquesne class ring, with its gold blackletter "D" set into a red stone, is a symbol of the university.

== Traditions and symbols ==
1920 alma mater

Alma Mater, old Duquesne,
Guide and friend of our youthful days,
We, thy sons and daughters all,
Our loyal voices raise.
The hours we spent at thy mother's knee
And drank of wisdom's store,
Shall e'er in memory treasured be,
Though we roam the whole world o'er.
Then forward ever, dear Alma Mater,
O'er our hearts unrivaled reign.
Onward ever, old Alma Mater!
All hail to thee, Duquesne!

— Words by the Rev. John F. Malloy, set to music by Joseph Carl Breil

Duquesne's coat of arms adapts the arms of the Duquesne family, represented by a black lion on a silver field. A red book held by the lion was added to symbolize higher learning, while the red and blue upper portion of the shield bears a white dove representing the Holy Spirit and uses the colors of the Congregation of the Holy Ghost. The university adopted the arms in 1923 and incorporated them into its seal in 1926. A Spiritan priest, John F. Malloy, designed the original arms, which were modified by heraldic designer Pierre de Chaignon la Rose. Malloy also selected the university's motto, Spiritus est qui vivificat ("It is the Spirit who gives life"), from the Gospel of John (6:63).

The Duquesne class ring is one of the university's longest-standing traditions and a prominent symbol among its alumni. Members of the class of 1925 formed a committee to design a common ring, initially selecting a deep-blue octagonal stone embossed with an Old English-style letter "D". The stone was changed to red in 1927, and modifications adopted in 1936 established the design that remains in use. A large sculpture modeled on the ring was installed near Old Main in 2015, and students may have their rings blessed at an annual ceremony.

The university's original alma mater, "Alma Mater, Old Duquesne", was written by John F. Malloy, with music by composer Joseph Carl Breil. It was approved and first performed in October 1920. In 2022, Duquesne introduced a refreshed alma mater with lyrics by university president Ken Gormley and music by Robert Traugh, a member of the Mary Pappert School of Music faculty. It was first performed publicly at the university's winter commencement that December.

== Notable alumni and former students ==
Duquesne reported 106,674 living alumni as of October 2025.

Alumni in government, law, and public service include Catherine Baker Knoll, the first woman elected lieutenant governor of Pennsylvania; retired Air Force general Michael Hayden, who directed both the National Security Agency and the Central Intelligence Agency; legal scholar and civil-rights advocate Derrick Bell; and Pakistani economist and former finance minister Miftah Ismail. Catholic prelates educated at Duquesne include cardinals Adam Maida and Daniel DiNardo, former bishops of Pittsburgh Vincent Leonard and David Zubik, and David Bonnar, bishop of Youngstown. Alumni in the arts and media include actor Tom Atkins, singer Bobby Vinton, jazz composer and arranger Sammy Nestico, and sports journalist John Clayton. German filmmaker Werner Herzog briefly studied at Duquesne but did not graduate. Athletic alumni include Chuck Cooper, the first Black player selected in an NBA draft; Pittsburgh Steelers founder Art Rooney and his son Dan Rooney, who later served as United States ambassador to Ireland; and former NBA player Norm Nixon.|

In 2026, the mayor of Pittsburgh, the bishop of Pittsburgh, and the superior general of the Spiritans were all Duquesne alumni: Corey O'Connor, Mark Eckman, and Alain Mayama, respectively.
