= Duquesne University School of Nursing =

Nursing school of Duquesne University in Pittsburgh, Pennsylvania

Coordinates: 40.43820°N 79.99317°W

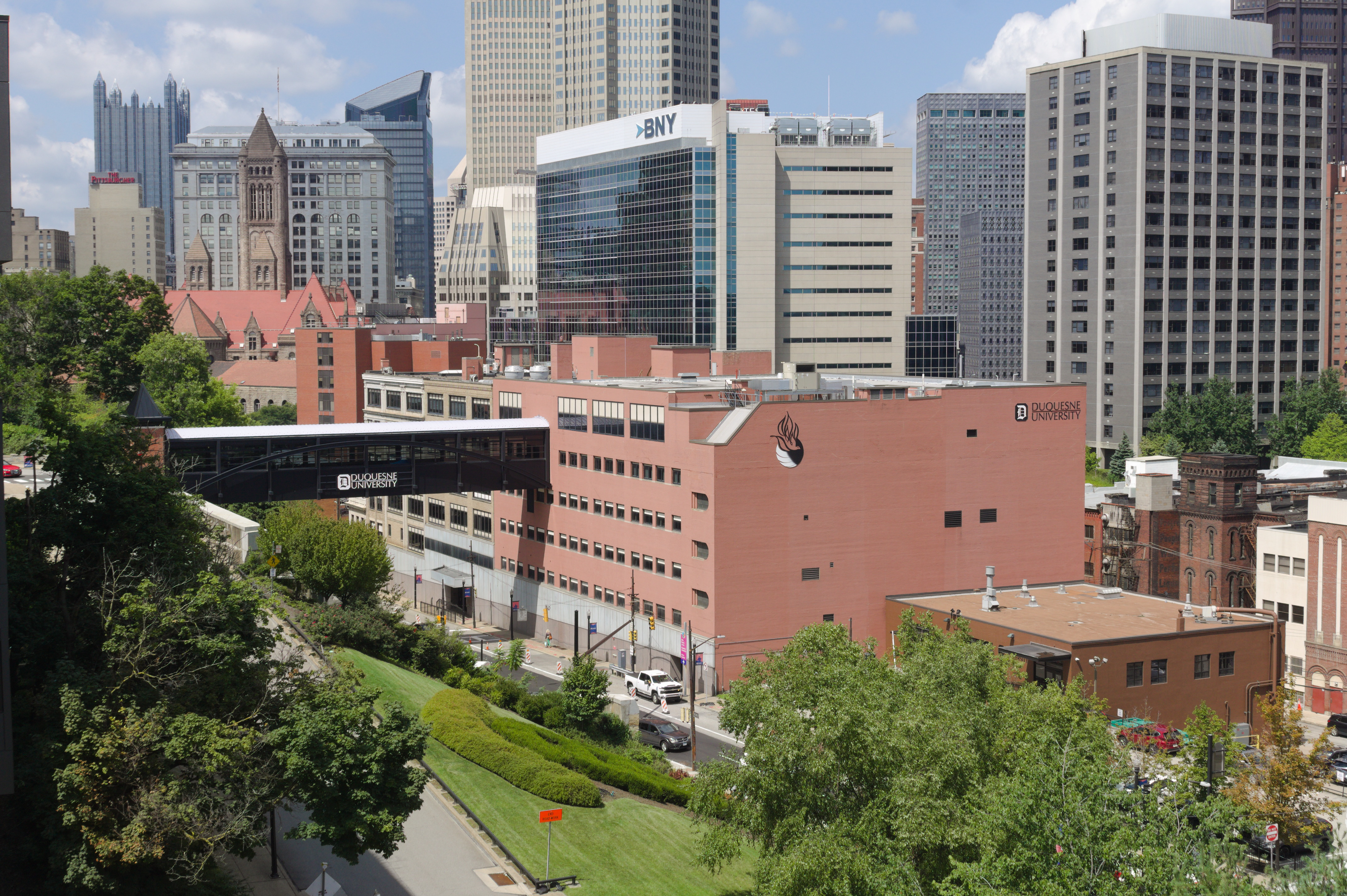
The Duquesne University School of Nursing is housed in Fisher Hall along Forbes Avenue in Pittsburgh's Bluff neighborhood.

The Duquesne University School of Nursing is the nursing school of Duquesne University in Pittsburgh, Pennsylvania. Founded in 1935 and established as a separate school in 1937, it offers undergraduate and graduate programs in nursing, including Bachelor of Science in Nursing (BSN), Master of Science in Nursing (MSN), Doctor of Nursing Practice (DNP) and Doctor of Philosophy (PhD) programs. The school is based in Fisher Hall on Duquesne's main campus.

== History ==
The School of Nursing was founded in 1935 as a unit of Duquesne's College of Liberal Arts and Sciences. In 1937, it became an independent school and received approval from the Pennsylvania State Board of Education to confer the Bachelor of Science in Nursing and Bachelor of Science in Nursing Education. Its BSN program for students entering directly from high school was the first of its kind in Pennsylvania.

The school continued to offer separate nursing and nursing-education degrees until 1964, when they were replaced by a revised BSN curriculum serving both beginning students and registered nurses. An RN–BSN program was established in 1982. Graduate education began in 1986 with the introduction of the Master of Science in Nursing, and a second-degree BSN program for students who already held bachelor's degrees was established in 1991.

The school began offering the PhD in Nursing in 1994. In 1997, it introduced what Duquesne describes as the first online PhD in Nursing program in the United States. A Doctor of Nursing Practice program was established in 2008.

In 2014, Duquesne introduced a five-year dual-degree program combining nursing and biomedical engineering, leading to both a BSN and a Bachelor of Science in Biomedical Engineering. A PhD in Nursing Ethics followed in 2017. In 2025, the school established a Doctor of Nursing Practice program in nurse anesthesia. The nurse-anesthesia program received initial accreditation from the Council on Accreditation of Nurse Anesthesia Educational Programs in May 2025.

== Academics ==
The school's undergraduate programs include the traditional four-year BSN, accelerated second-degree BSN programs for students who already hold bachelor's degrees, and the five-year biomedical engineering and nursing dual-degree program. The traditional BSN combines coursework in the liberal arts and sciences with nursing theory, simulation and clinical education.

Graduate programs include MSN tracks in adult-gerontology acute care, executive nurse leadership and health care management, family nurse practitioner practice, forensic nursing, nursing education and psychiatric-mental health nursing. The school also offers post-master's certificates, several DNP programs, the PhD in Nursing and the PhD in Nursing Ethics.

== Accreditation and recognition ==
The school's baccalaureate, master's, Doctor of Nursing Practice and post-graduate APRN certificate programs are accredited by the Commission on Collegiate Nursing Education. Its Doctor of Nursing Practice in Nurse Anesthesia is separately accredited by the Council on Accreditation of Nurse Anesthesia Educational Programs.

The National League for Nursing designated the school a 2025 Center of Excellence in Nursing Education for enhancing student learning and professional development.

== Administration ==
Mary Ellen Smith Glasgow has served as dean of the School of Nursing since 2012. Duquesne reappointed her to another term in 2025.
