= Ken Gormley =

Ken Gormley may refer to:

- Ken Gormley (musician), Australian musician
- Ken Gormley (academic) (born 1955), American constitutional law professor

== See also ==
- John Kenneth Gormley (born 1957), Canadian radio host
