= Duquesne University School of Pharmacy =

Pharmacy school of Duquesne University

Coordinates: 40.43803°N 79.99362°W

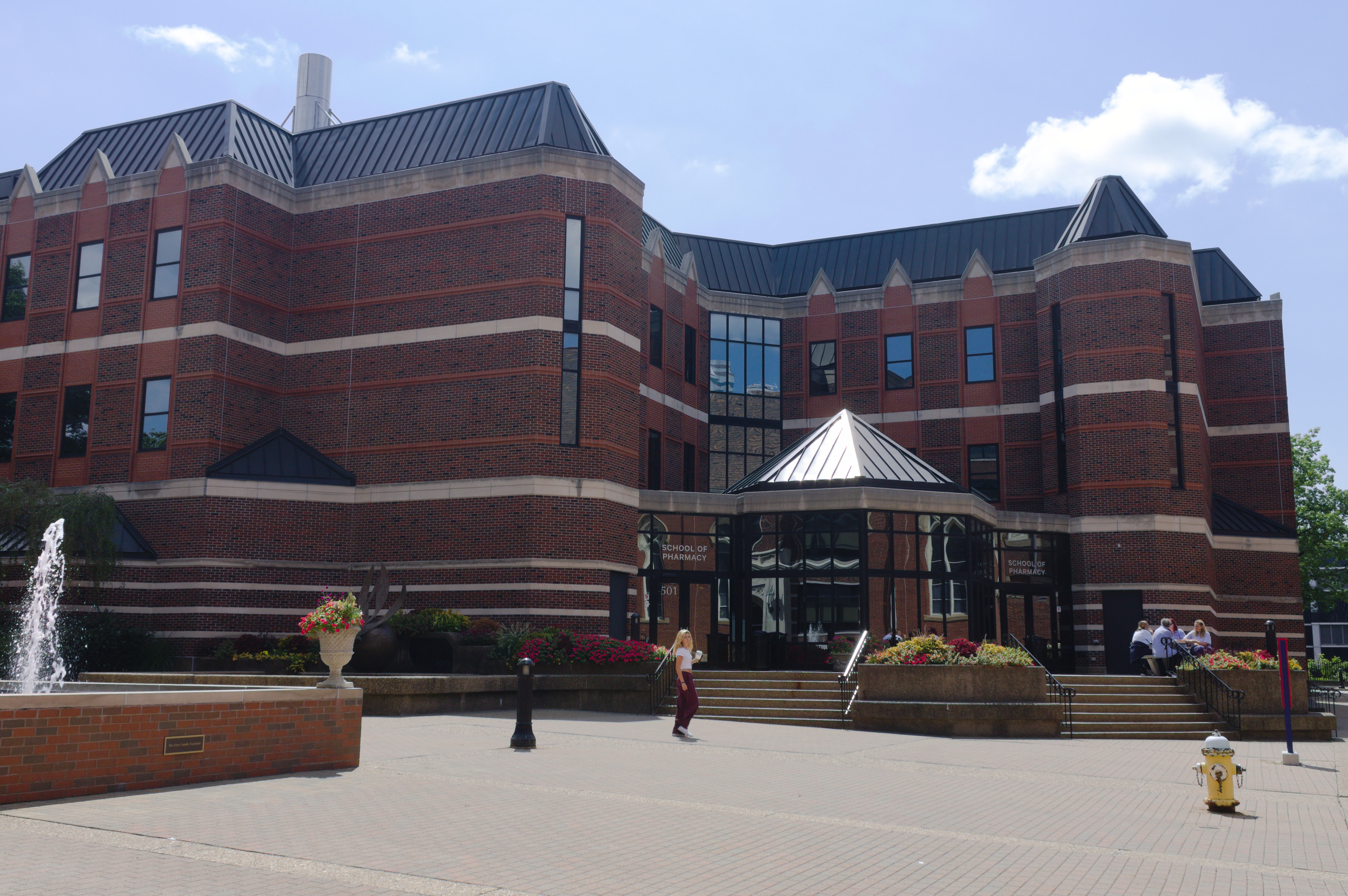
The School of Pharmacy building, formerly the Bayer Learning Center, on the campus of Duquesne University

The Duquesne University School of Pharmacy is the pharmacy school of Duquesne University in Pittsburgh, Pennsylvania. Founded in 1925, it offers undergraduate degrees in pharmaceutical sciences, on-campus and online Doctor of Pharmacy programs, and graduate degrees through the Graduate School of Pharmaceutical Sciences. Its Pharm.D. program is accredited by the Accreditation Council for Pharmacy Education.

== History ==
The school was founded in 1925 under Hugh C. Muldoon, who served as its first dean until 1955. During his tenure, the school introduced a four-year Bachelor of Science in Pharmacy curriculum. A five-year bachelor's curriculum was adopted during the deanship of John G. Adams from 1955 to 1961.

Under John S. Ruggiero, dean from 1961 to 1970, the school incorporated clinical pharmacy and elective study into its curriculum and moved from Canevin Hall to the newly constructed Mellon Hall of Science. Bruce D. Martin, who served as dean from 1970 to 1981, oversaw the expansion of enrollment, faculty and experiential education.

During the deanship of Douglas H. Kay from 1981 to 1998, the school adopted the six-year professional Doctor of Pharmacy curriculum. The Graduate School of Pharmaceutical Sciences was established in 1990, when the school's pharmaceutical sciences faculty and programs were separated from Duquesne's College and Graduate School of Arts and Sciences.

Under J. Douglas Bricker, dean from 2007 to 2020, the school introduced weekend and online Pharm.D. pathways and established several research centers. During the subsequent deanship of James K. Drennen III, the school added bachelor's programs in pharmaceutical sciences and pharmacy foundations and a Master of Science in Pharmaceutical Sciences. The school marked its centennial in 2025.

== Academics ==
The on-campus Pharm.D. is a six-year direct-entry program consisting of a two-year pre-professional phase followed by four years of professional study. The four-year online pathway is available to students who have completed the required prerequisite coursework. Most instruction is delivered online, although students attend laboratory and professional-development sessions on campus and complete experiential education in clinical settings.

The school also offers Bachelor of Science degrees in pharmaceutical sciences and pharmacy foundations. The Graduate School of Pharmaceutical Sciences awards Master of Science, Master of Science in Pharmaceutical Sciences and Doctor of Philosophy degrees. Its fields of study include pharmaceutics and pharmacology, with industrial pharmacy offered through the non-thesis master's program.

== National rankings ==
In the 2026 U.S. News & World Report Best Graduate Schools rankings, Duquesne University's Doctor of Pharmacy program was ranked 2nd among pharmacy programs in Pennsylvania. The university is also the highest-ranked Catholic school of pharmacy in the United States.

== Facilities and centers ==
The school occupies facilities in Mellon Hall of Science and the adjacent Bayer Learning Center. The fourth floor of Mellon Hall contains more than 30,000 sq ft (2,800 m^{2}) of faculty offices, classrooms and research laboratories. The Duquesne University Center for Pharmaceutical Technology operates an industrial pharmacy laboratory in the building.

Other units associated with the school include the Center for Integrative Health, the Center for Pharmacy Care and the Giant Eagle Center for Pharmacy Practice.

== Administration ==
James K. Drennen III has served as dean of the School of Pharmacy and Graduate School of Pharmaceutical Sciences since 2020.
