= John G. Rangos School of Health Sciences =

Health sciences school of Duquesne University

Coordinates: 40.437769°N 79.991412°W

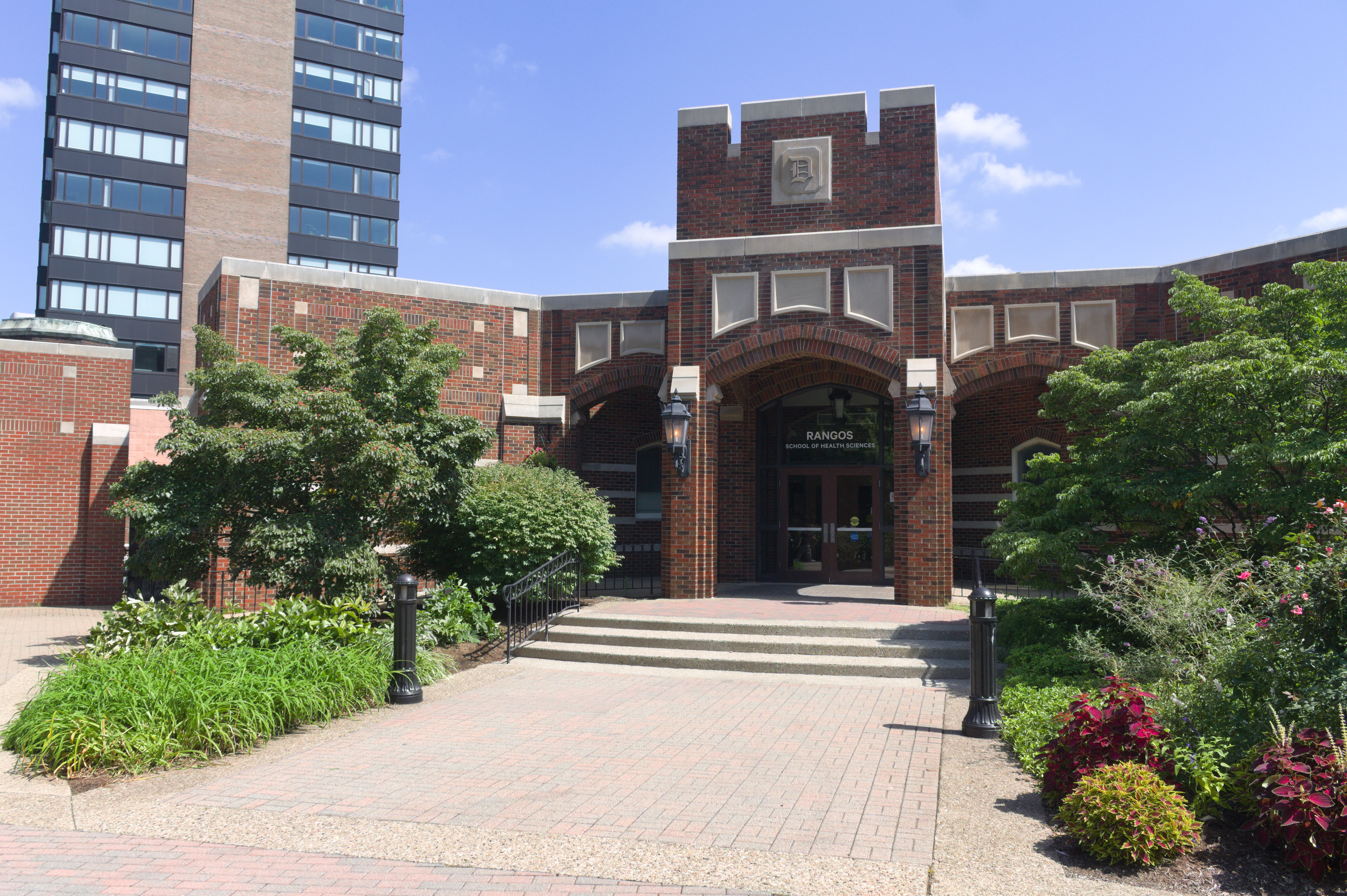
The Rangos School of Health Sciences on the campus of Duquesne University

The John G. Rangos Sr. School of Health Sciences is the health sciences school of Duquesne University in Pittsburgh, Pennsylvania. Established in 1990, the school offers undergraduate and graduate programs in health administration, health sciences, public health, athletic training, occupational therapy, physical therapy, physician assistant studies, and speech-language pathology.

== History ==
Duquesne president John E. Murray Jr. announced the creation of the School of Health Sciences on January 29, 1990. It was the first new school established at Duquesne since 1937. On March 18, 1991, businessman and philanthropist John G. Rangos Sr., the John G. Rangos Charitable Foundation, and the Chambers Development Charitable Foundation made a major gift in support of the school, which was subsequently named for him.

The school's first undergraduate students entered programs in athletic training, health management systems, occupational therapy, perfusion technology, physical therapy, and physician assistant studies in 1991. The professional phases of several of these programs were introduced over the following two years, and the school became fully operational during the 1993–94 academic year. Speech-language pathology was added in 1996, with its professional phase beginning in 1998. The perfusion technology program ended after its final class graduated in 2002.

The Department of Engineering joined the Rangos School on July 1, 2019. In April 2023, Duquesne transferred the biomedical engineering program to the former School of Natural and Environmental Sciences as part of an expansion that created the School of Science and Engineering.

== Academics ==
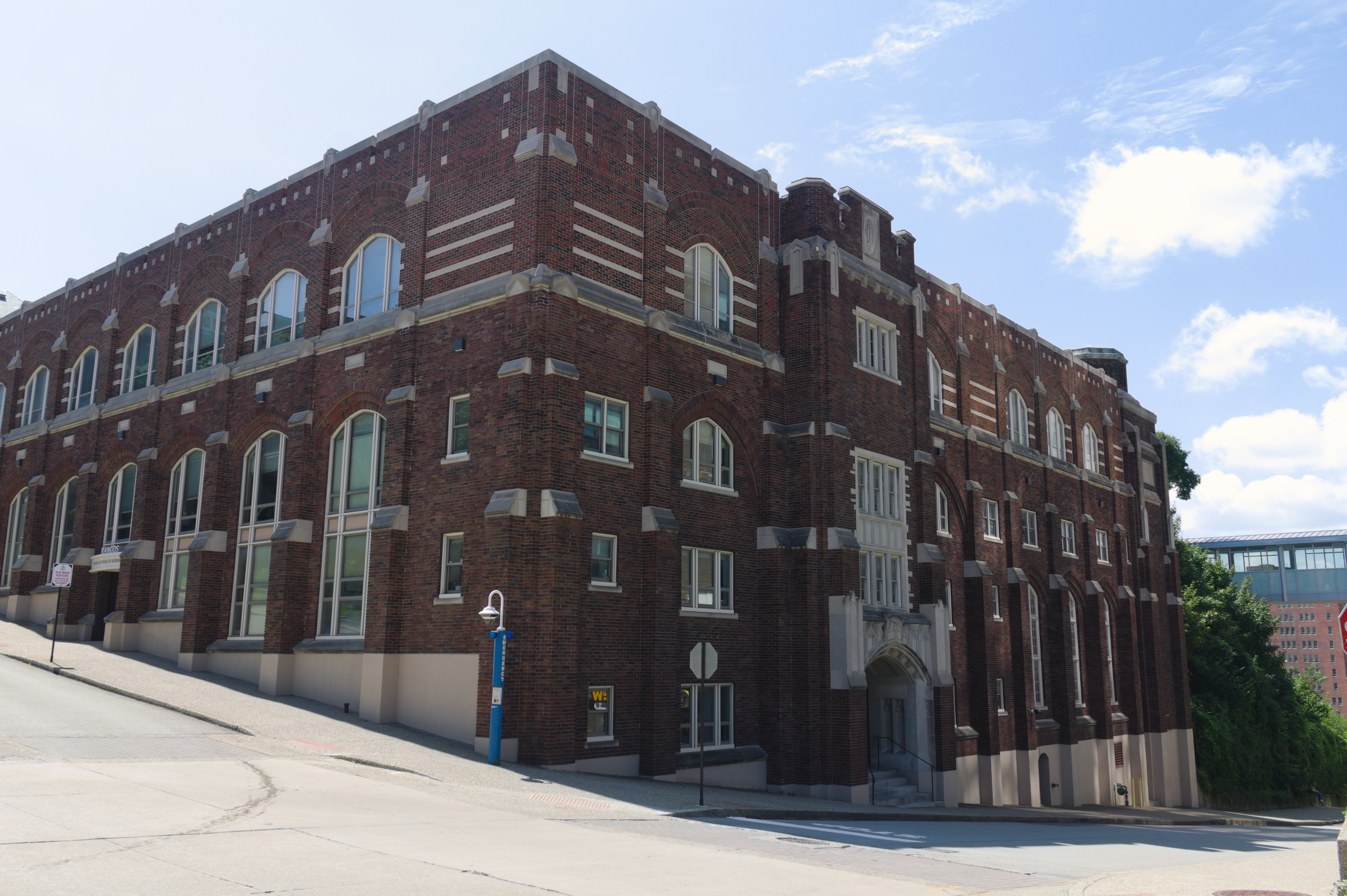
The building that currently houses the Rangos School was originally constructed as the university gymnasium.

The school offers four-year undergraduate programs in health administration, health sciences, and public health. Its professional programs include athletic training, occupational therapy, physical therapy, physician assistant studies, and speech-language pathology. Several are structured as direct-entry programs in which undergraduate study progresses into the professional degree.

Graduate offerings include the Master of Science in Athletic Training, Master of Health Administration, occupational therapy programs, Doctor of Physical Therapy, Master of Science in Speech-Language Pathology, and doctoral study in rehabilitation science and health sciences.

== Accreditation ==
Programs within the school hold specialized professional accreditation. The athletic training program is accredited by the Commission on Accreditation of Athletic Training Education, and the occupational therapy programs are accredited by the Accreditation Council for Occupational Therapy Education. The Doctor of Physical Therapy program has been accredited by the Commission on Accreditation in Physical Therapy Education since 1993.

The physician assistant program is accredited by the Accreditation Review Commission on Education for the Physician Assistant, and the Master of Science program in speech-language pathology is accredited by the Council on Academic Accreditation in Audiology and Speech-Language Pathology. The speech-language pathology program was first accredited in 2002 and is accredited through 2031.

== Facilities ==
The school is based in the Health Sciences Building on Duquesne's main campus. In 2025, the university announced plans for a new $68 million, 80,000-square-foot (7,400 m^{2}) health sciences building on Forbes Avenue. The planned five-story building is intended to consolidate the school's programs and include classrooms, laboratories, simulation facilities, and clinical space. The City of Pittsburgh's planning commission approved the project in January 2026, with completion planned for fall 2028.

== Administration ==
Fevzi Akinci has served as dean of the school since July 2017. He was appointed to a third term in 2024.
