= Duquesne University Nasuti College of Osteopathic Medicine =

Medical school of Duquesne University in Pittsburgh, Pennsylvania

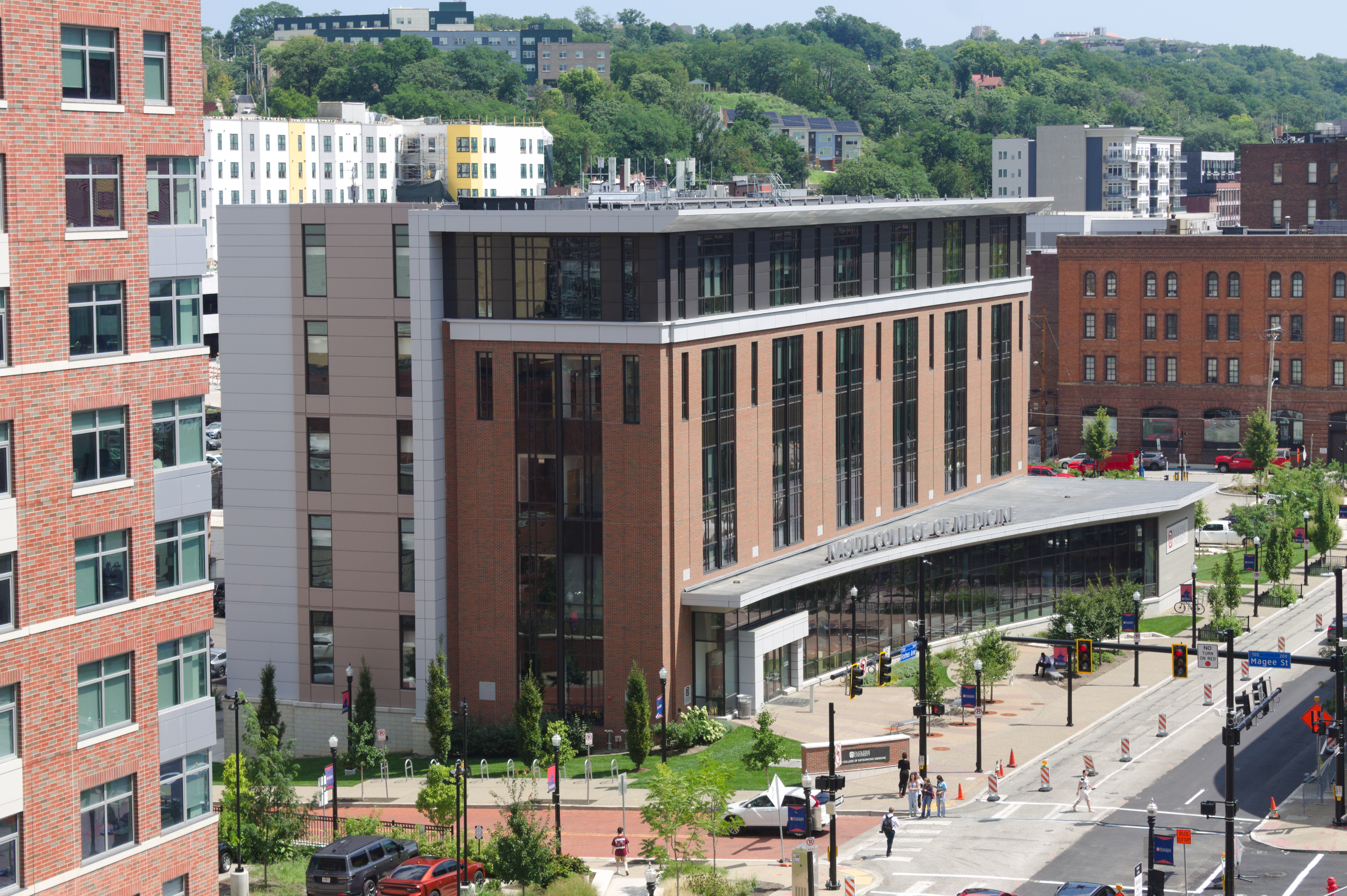
- The College of Osteopathic Medicine building on Duquesne's campus, completed in 2024.
- Type: Private medical school
- Established: 2024
- Parent institution: Duquesne University
- Dean: John M. Kauffman Jr.
- Location: Pittsburgh, Pennsylvania, United States; 40.43784°N 79.98820°W
- Campus: Urban
- Website: www.duq.edu/academics/colleges-and-schools/college-of-osteopathic-medicine/

The Duquesne University Nasuti College of Osteopathic Medicine (DUQ-NCOM) is the medical school of Duquesne University in Pittsburgh, Pennsylvania. Opened in 2024, the college offers the Doctor of Osteopathic Medicine (D.O.) and Master of Biomedical Sciences degrees. Its D.O. program holds pre-accreditation status from the Commission on Osteopathic College Accreditation.

== History ==
Duquesne announced plans for a college of osteopathic medicine in 2019. The medical school building opened on January 17, 2024, and the inaugural class began coursework that July. The first class consisted of 91 students.

In October 2025, Duquesne renamed the college for Jim and Celeste Nasuti following an undisclosed gift to support scholarships and faculty development. The university described the commitment as the second largest in its history.

== Campus and clinical training ==
The college is housed in a 80,600 sq ft (7,490 m^{2}) building on Forbes Avenue in Uptown Pittsburgh. The facility includes a simulation hospital with an operating room, intensive care unit, three-bed emergency department, labor and delivery room, ultrasound laboratory, and 12 outpatient examination rooms.

Construction of the building cost approximately $55.5 million, with an additional $7.5 million spent on related construction elsewhere on campus. Duquesne estimated that establishing and operating the medical school during its first seven years would require approximately $151 million in start-up costs.

Third- and fourth-year students complete clinical training through more than 22 partner health systems and hospitals in Pennsylvania, Ohio, and West Virginia. Clinical partners include the Allegheny Health Network, UPMC Mercy Hospital (Adjacent to Duquesne's Campus) St. Clair Hospital (Member of the Mayo Clinic Care Network) and the VA Pittsburgh Healthcare System.

== Academics ==
The college offers the four-year Doctor of Osteopathic Medicine program and a ten-month Master of Biomedical Sciences program.

== See also ==
- List of medical schools in the United States
