= List of Niagara University people =

This List of Niagara University people includes alumni, faculty, presidents, and other individuals associated with Niagara University.

== Founders ==
- Bishop John Timon, C.M.
- Father John J. Lynch, C.M.

== Presidents ==
- 1-
- 2-
- 3-
- 4-Robert E. V. Rice, C.M. (1863– )
- 5-Patrick V. Kavanagh, C.M.
- 6-
- 7-
- 8-
- 9-Edward J. Walsh, C.M. (1908–1912)
- 10-
- 11-
- 12-
- 13-
- 14-
- 15-
- 16-Francis L. Meade, C.M. (1947-1957)
- 17-
- 18-
- 19-Kenneth F. Slattery, C.M. (1965-1976)
- 20-Gerard M. “Jerry” Mahoney, C.M. (1976-1981)
- 21-John G. Nugent, C.M. (1981-1984)
- 22-Donald J. Harrington, C.M. (1984-1989)
- 23-Brian J. O'Connell, C.M. (1989-1995)
- 24-Paul L. Golden, C.M. (1995-2000)
- 25-Joseph L. Levesque, C.M. (2000-2013)
- 26-James J. Maher, C.M. (2013-)

== Notable alumni ==
=== Academics ===
- Elsa Salazar Cade, award-winning science teacher and entomologist
- Teresa J. Domzal, Dean of the George Mason University School of Management
- Dennis Holtschneider C.M., President of DePaul University.
- David M. O'Connell C.M., former president of The Catholic University of America
- David Sylvester, Principal of King's University College

=== Arts and entertainment ===
- Patrick Cowley, American electronic musician and producer
- Eric Gale, American jazz and session guitarist
- Jim Hutton, actor, noted for role in Where the Boys Are and playing detective Ellery Queen
- Peter Makuck, poet, short story writer, and critic
- Becky O'Donohue, American Idol semi-finalist and model
- Jessie O'Donohue, model
- John O'Hara, American writer
- Michele Ragusa, American actress and singer

=== Business ===
- Pasquale J. D'Amuro, Chairman and CEO of Giulani Security and Safety
- Robert Wegman, Founder, Wegmans Super Markets

=== Government ===
- Alfred F. Beiter, former U.S. Representative from New York (1933-1939, 1941-1943).
- Stephen S. Blake, former New York State Assemblyman
- John P. Bobo, U.S. Marine Corps officer; posthumously awarded the Medal of Honor for heroism
- Earl Brydges, former Temporary President and Majority Leader of the New York State Senate
- Thomas F. Burchill, former U.S. Representative from New York
- Joseph L. Carrigg, former U.S. Representative from Pennsylvania (1951-1958)
- John Katko, U.S. Representative from New York
- Dave Levac, Canadian politician
- George Maziarz, former New York State Senator
- Kandia Milton, Convicted ex-Deputy Mayor, city of Detroit, Michigan. Pleaded guilty to accepting bribes while acting as a public official.
- Leo W. O'Brien, U.S. Representative from New York (1952-1966).
- Frank D. O'Connor, former New York State Senator
- Gilbert Parent, former Speaker of the Canadian House of Commons between 1994 and 2001
- Dan Schaefer, U.S. Representative from Colorado (1983-1999)
- Michael Scheuer, CIA analyst and author of Imperial Hubris.
- Hugh B. Scott (1949–2021), first African American to become Assistant United States Attorney.
- Frederick J. Scullin, Senior Judge on the United States District Court for the Northern District of New York
- James Shanahan, U.S. Army Brigadier General; Aide to U.S. President Harry S. Truman
- Thomas J. Stapleton, Pennsylvania State Representative for the 165th district (1975-1978

=== Religion ===
- Anthony Raymond Ceresko (1942–2005), Old Testament scholar
- Venerable Nelson Baker (1842–1936), Founder of the "City of Charity" under the patronage of Our Lady of Victory
- Octavio Cisneros (born 1945), Cuban American prelate of the Roman Catholic Church; Auxiliary Bishop of Brooklyn
- Edmund Michael Dunne (1864–1929), American prelate of the Roman Catholic Church; Bishop of Peoria
- Joseph Lennox Federal (1910–2000), American prelate of the Roman Catholic Church; Bishop of Salt Lake City
- Edmund Gibbons (1868–1964), American prelate of the Roman Catholic Church; Bishop of Albany
- Thomas Francis Lillis (1861–1938), American prelate of the Roman Catholic Church; Bishop of Leavenworth & Bishop of Kansas City
- Blessed Michael J. McGivney (1852–1890), Founder of the Knights of Columbus
- James Johnston Navagh (1901–1965), American prelate of the Roman Catholic Church; Bishop of Ogdensburg & Bishop of Paterson
- Jan Pitass (1844–1913), Founder of St. Stanislaus Parish in Buffalo, New York
- Donald Walter Trautman (1936–2022), American prelate of the Roman Catholic Church; Bishop of Erie

=== Sports ===
==== Baseball ====
- Shad Barry (1878–1936), Major League Baseball player
- Chris Begg (born 1979), professional baseball player; member of Team Canada during the 2004 Summer Olympics
- Benny Bengough (1898–1968), Major League Baseball player
- Matt Broderick (1877–1940), Major League Baseball player
- Harry Croft (1875–1933), Major League Baseball player
- Jim Doyle (1886–1912), Major League Baseball player
- Bill Friel (1876–1959), Major League Baseball player
- Ray Keating (1893–1963), Major League Baseball player
- Ed Lennon (1897–1947), Major League Baseball player
- Ernie Lush (1885–1937), Major League Baseball player
- Walt Lynch (1897–1976), Major League Baseball player
- Sal Maglie (1917–1992), Major League Baseball player
- Joe McCarthy (catcher) (1881–1937), Major League Baseball player
- Joe McCarthy (manager) (1887–1978), Major League Baseball player and manager
- Dusty Miller (1867–1945), Major League Baseball player
- Vince Molyneaux (1888–1950), Major League Baseball player
- Rinty Monahan (1928–2003), Major League Baseball player

==== Basketball ====
- Joe Arlauckas (born 1965), former professional basketball player
- John Beilein (born 1953), former collegiate men's basketball head coach
- Hubie Brown (born 1933), former NBA coach and TV analyst.
- Al Butler (1938–2000), former NBA player
- T. J. Cline (born 1994), American-Israeli basketball player
- Larry Costello (1931–2001), former professional basketball player and coach
- Charron Fisher (born 1985), former professional basketball player in Europe
- Sam Iorio (born 1998), American-Israeli professional basketball player in the Israeli Basketball Premier League
- Frank Layden (born 1932), former NBA coach and executive
- Manny Leaks (born 1945), former professional basketball player
- Juan Mendez (born 1981), highest scoring Canadian in Division I men's basketball history
- Calvin Murphy (born 1948), former professional basketball player and former TV analyst
- James Reaves (born 1982), former professional basketball player
- Zeke Sinicola (1929–2011), 1st round pick [4th overall] of the 1951 NBA Draft by the Fort Wayne Pistons.
- Joe Smyth (1929–1999), former professional basketball player
- Chris Watson (born 1975), American-Israeli basketball player

==== American Football ====
- Dan DeSantis (1918–2004), former National Football League player
- Bob Stefik (1923–2008), former National Football League player

==== Hockey ====
- Sean Bentivoglio (born 1985), Canadian–Italian professional hockey player
- Barret Ehgoetz (born 1981), Canadian professional hockey player
- Greg Gardner (born 1975), Canadian ice hockey player and coach
- Les Reaney (born 1984), Canadian professional hockey player
- Matt Ryan (born 1983), Canadian professional hockey player
- Joe Tallari (born 1980), Canadian professional hockey player
