= Joseph L. Levesque =

American academic administrator (died 2024)

The Very Reverend Joseph L. Levesque CM

Interim President of St. John's University
- In office 2013 – July 2014
- Preceded by: Donald J. Harrington
- Succeeded by: Conrado Gempesaw

President of Niagara University
- In office 2000–2013
- Preceded by: Paul L. Golden
- Succeeded by: James J. Maher

Personal details
- Born: 1938/1939 North Tarrytown, New York, U.S.
- Died: June 23, 2024 (aged 85) Philadelphia, Pennsylvania, U.S.
- Education: Mary Immaculate Seminary; Manhattan College; The Catholic University of America
- Profession: Catholic priest and educator

Joseph Leo Levesque, CM (1938 or 1939 – June 23, 2024) was an American Catholic priest of the Congregation of the Mission. He was Niagara University's 25th president, serving from 2000 to 2013. He also served as interim president of St. John's University from 2013 to 2014.

== Biography ==
Born in North Tarrytown, New York, to Joseph Levesque (d 1980) of Quebec and Yvonne Levesque (1907-1994) of Millinocket, Maine, Levesque entered the Congregation of the Mission after high school. He was ordained a priest in 1967 after studies at Mary Immaculate Seminary in Northampton, Pennsylvania, where he received the degree of Master of Divinity. He then served as an instructor in the Religious Studies Department at St. John's Preparatory School in the Bedford-Stuyvesant neighborhood of Brooklyn from 1967 to 1969; at St. Joseph's Seminary in Princeton, New Jersey from 1969 to 1970, and at Niagara University in 1970.

In 1971, Levesque received a Master of Arts in Religious studies from Manhattan College, and in 1977 he obtained the degree of Doctor of Sacred Theology from The Catholic University of America.

Levesque resumed teaching at Niagara, where he was appointed dean of the College of Arts and Sciences and director of the university's graduate division in 1978. He remained there until 1986 when he returned to St. Joseph's Seminary in Princeton, New Jersey, where he served as university president, superior of the Vincentian community, and teacher of Religion, Morality, and Social Justice. In 1990 Father Levesque was elected Provincial Superior of the Eastern American Province of the Congregation of the Mission and Chair of the Board of Trustees of Niagara University and St. John’s University. He stepped down from the position in June 1999 after the maximum nine-year term and subsequently assumed the presidency of Niagara University in 2000.

After leaving Niagara in 2013, Levesque was appointed interim president of St. John's University, an appointment which began on August 1, 2013, upon the retirement of Donald J. Harrington, CM. He concluded his service in 2014.

Levesque died in Philadelphia on June 23, 2024, at the age of 85.

Preceded by Paul L. Golden, C.M.	President of Niagara University; 2000–2013	Succeeded by James J. Maher, C.M.
Preceded by Daniel J. Harrington, C.M.	Interim President of St. John's University (New York); 2013–2014	Succeeded by Conrado “Bobby” Gempesaw
