= James J. Maher =

American Priest and Academic Administrator

The Reverend James J. Maher CM

26th President of Niagara University
- Incumbent
- Assumed office 2013
- Preceded by: Joseph L. Levesque

Personal details
- Born: Maywood, New Jersey, U.S.
- Education: St. John's University (BA); Mary Immaculate Seminary (MDiv, ThM); Seton Hall University (DDiv)
- Profession: Catholic priest and educator

James J. Maher, C.M. is an American Catholic priest and academic administrator who has served as Niagara University's 26th president since 2013. He succeeded Joseph L. Levesque and as a member of the Vincentians.

== Early life and education ==
Maher was born in Maywood, New Jersey. In 1984, Maher received a Bachelor of Arts in Sociology from St. John's University. In 1989 he obtained a Master of Divinity and in 1990 a Master of Theology from Mary Immaculate Seminary, followed by a Doctor of Ministry (D.Min.) from the Immaculate Conception Seminary School of Theology in 2004.

== Career ==
Maher pronounced his vows to the Vincentian community in May 1989 and was ordained to the priesthood on May 26, 1990.

Since then, he has been Campus Minister (1994–1999), Vice President for University Ministry (1999-2005), Vice President for Student Affairs (2004-2010), executive director of the Vincentian Institute for Social Action (2009-2010) and Executive Vice President for Mission and Student Services (2011-2013) at St. John's University.

Preceded by Joseph L. Levesque, C.M.	President of Niagara University; 2013–present	Succeeded by
