= Association of Catholic Colleges and Universities =

US organization of Catholic higher-learning institutions

- Abbreviation: ACCU
- Formation: 1899
- Type: Nonprofit association of colleges and universities
- Purpose: Promote and strengthen the mission and character of Catholic higher education in the United States
- Headquarters: Washington, D.C.
- Region served: United States
- President: Donna Carroll
- Affiliations: IFCU
- Website: www.accunet.org

The Association of Catholic Colleges and Universities (ACCU) is a voluntary association of delegates from Catholic institutions of higher learning.

In 2026, ACCU lists a total of 178 Catholic institutions of higher education in the United States and 24 institutions in other countries.

== History ==
In 1898, Thomas Conaty rector of the Catholic University of America, wrote to nearly 100 Catholic college to discuss Catholic higher education. The letter led to an April 1899 meeting in Chicago attended by fifty-three delegates from Catholic colleges across the United States where the organization was founded.

Currently the association includes more than 90% of accredited Catholic institutions of higher learning in the United States as well as 24 international universities.

The president or rector of each participating institution serves as voting representative to the ACCU. There is also collaboration with the United States Conference of Catholic Bishops and the National Catholic Educational Association.

In 2026, presidents of members universities met with Pope Leo XIV in Rome.

== List of notable presidents ==
- Thomas James Conaty, (1899–1903) Catholic University of America
- Aloysius J. Hogan, SJ, (1935–1937) Fordham University
- Paul C. Reinert, SJ, (1956–1958) Saint Louis University
- Alfred F. Horrigan, 1962–1964) Bellarmine University
- Michael P. Walsh, SJ (1966–1968) Boston College
- Monika Hellwig (1996–2005) Georgetown University
- Dennis H. Holtschneider, C.M. (2019–2024) DePaul University
