= Donald J. Harrington =

American Catholic priest

The Reverend Donald J. Harrington CM
- Born: 1945 (age 79–80); Brooklyn, New York, U.S.
- Education: Mary Immaculate Seminary
- Occupation: American Catholic Priest
- Notable work: 15th President of St. John's University

Donald J. Harrington, C.M. (born 1945), is an American Catholic priest of the Congregation of the Mission who served as the fifteenth President of St. John's University in Queens, New York from 1989 until 2013. Before that post, he had been the President of Niagara University from 1984 to 1989.

== Life ==
Harrington was born in Brooklyn, New York, in 1945. After graduating from Regis High School in Manhattan, he was admitted to the Congregation of the Mission and studied at their junior college seminary in Princeton, New Jersey. He then completed his preparation for the ministry at Mary Immaculate Seminary in Northampton, Pennsylvania. He then pursued graduate studies at the Catholic University of America and the University of Toronto. He was ordained a priest in 1973.

== Career ==
After his ordination to the Catholic priesthood, Harrington was assigned to Niagara University. He served as an associate professor in Religious Studies, and later Director of Student Activities and Executive Vice President before being named the institution’s 22nd President. He was 38 years of age at the time, the youngest President in the history of the school. During his tenure at St. John's, he oversaw a transformation of the focus of the school from that of a commuter college, geared to the local Catholic population, to one which draws its student body from across the nation.

In addition to many honorary degrees from universities around the world, Harrington was awarded the Pro Ecclesia et Pontifice of by Pope John Paul II in 1989 and was named a Knight of the Holy Sepulchre in 1999. He was named a Knight (Italian: Cavaliere) of the Order of Merit of the Italian Republic in June 2003, and promoted to the rank of Grand Officer (Italian: Grande Ufficiale) in October 2003.

On May 3, 2013, Father Harrington announced that he would retire as President of St. John's University, effective July 31, 2013. Harrington's retirement announcement came in the middle of an investigation of corruption, in which he was widely criticized for accepting expensive gifts and trips during his presidency and for failing to supervise a dean of the university who was accused of embezzling a huge sum of money, in a scandal which resulted in that dean's suicide. He was succeeded by the Rev. Joseph L. Levesque, C.M., serving as Interim President.
