= Bellarmine Knights =

Intercollegiate athletic teams of Bellarmine University

- University: Bellarmine University
- Nickname: Knights
- NCAA: Division I
- Conference: ASUN (primary); SoCon (wrestling); MAC (field hockey); MSFL (sprint football)
- Athletic director: Scott Wiegandt
- Location: Louisville, Kentucky
- Varsity teams: 23 (11 men's, 10 women's, 2 co-ed)
- Basketball arena: Knights Hall
- Baseball stadium: Knights Baseball Field
- Softball stadium: Knights Softball Field
- Soccer stadium: Owsley B. Frazier Stadium
- Tennis venue: Eddie Weber Tennis Complex
- Colors: Scarlet and silver
- Website: athletics.bellarmine.edu

The Bellarmine Knights are the teams representing Bellarmine University, located in Louisville, Kentucky, in intercollegiate sports as a member of the NCAA Division I ranks, primarily competing in the Atlantic Sun Conference (ASUN) for most sports, as of the 2020–21 academic year. The Knights previously competed in the Great Lakes Valley Conference (GLVC) of the NCAA Division II ranks from 1978–79 to 2019–20.

== Overview ==
On June 18, 2019, it was officially announced that the Knights would join the ASUN beginning in the 2020–21 school year, starting a four-year transition to NCAA Division I. Five Bellarmine teams in sports that are not sponsored by the ASUN have varied homes. Bellarmine has been a member of the Southern Conference (SoCon) for wrestling since it joined the ASUN. The Knights had also been SoCon members in men's lacrosse, a sport in which they have competed as Division I members since the 2005 season (2004–05 school year), before the ASUN reinstated men's lacrosse in the 2022 season. Men's and women's swimming and diving joined the Coastal Collegiate Sports Association (CCSA), a now-defunct league with which the ASUN was a partner. The Bellarmine aquatics program is now housed in the ASUN, which effectively absorbed the swimming & diving side of the CCSA in 2023–24. (Note: After the ASUN took over CCSA swimming & diving, the CCSA sponsored only beach volleyball, and its final members left in 2025, two for the Big 12 Conference and two for the Mountain Pacific Sports Federation.) Field hockey became a Division I independent for 2020–21, and joined the Mid-American Conference as an affiliate member in July 2021. During the transition period, Knights teams other than men's lacrosse were ineligible for NCAA-sanctioned postseason play. Men's lacrosse was not subject to this restriction because it had been a D-I member before the transition. Sprint football, a variant of American football not governed by the NCAA, plays in the Midwest Sprint Football League.

== Conference affiliations ==
NCAA

- Great Lakes Valley Conference (1978–2020)
- Atlantic Sun Conference (2020–present)

== Varsity teams ==
Bellarmine competes in 25 intercollegiate varsity sports: Men's sports include baseball, basketball, cross country, golf, lacrosse, soccer, sprint football, swimming, tennis, track & field (Note: The NCAA officially considers indoor and outdoor track & field to be two separate sports, holding its indoor championships in its winter season and outdoor championships in its spring season.) and wrestling; while women's sports include basketball, cross country, field hockey, golf, soccer, softball, swimming, tennis, track & field, volleyball. Cheerleading and dance are listed as co-ed sports on Bellarmine's athletic website, although the dance team is all-female.

Notes

Men's sports	Women's sports
Baseball	Basketball
Basketball	Cross country
Cross country	Field hockey
Golf	Golf
Lacrosse	Soccer
Soccer	Softball
Sprint football	Swimming
Swimming	Tennis
Tennis	Track and field^{†}
Track and field^{†}	Volleyball
Wrestling	
† – Track and field includes both indoor and outdoor.

=== Championships ===
On March 26, 2011, the Knights won the NCAA Men's Division II Basketball Championship.

On April 10, 2015, the Bellarmine University Dance Team captured their first national title at the 2015 NDA Collegiate Dance Championship. On April 5, 2019, the team captured its second national title at the 2019 NDA Collegiate Dance Championship.

== Individual sports ==
=== Lacrosse ===
The university announced the athletic department would begin sponsoring men's lacrosse in 2004. BU hired Jack McGetrick as the program's first head coach. In 2005 the team competed as independent members in NCAA Division I. In 2007 the Knights joined the Great Western Lacrosse League (GWLL) after the league lost Butler to athletic department cuts. In 2010 the GWLL ceased operations after Notre Dame left the league for the Big East. Bellarmine and the remaining members of the GWLL joined the ECAC Lacrosse League.

Tragedy struck the Knights Lacrosse program in October 2010 when coach McGetrick died after a long battle with cancer. Since founding the program he led the Knights to a 45–41 record. Before Bellarmine, McGetrick coached of the University of Hartford Hawks for 11 seasons. McGetrick ranks in the top-50 of Division I men's lacrosse coaches with a record of 132–115.

The 2014 season was Bellarmine's last in ECAC Lacrosse. After the Big Ten Conference announced it would begin sponsoring both men's and women's lacrosse in the 2014–15 school year (2015 season), which took two of the six schools then in the league, Bellarmine announced it would become a lacrosse-only member of the ASUN effective in July 2014. However, before the conference move took effect, the ASUN and Southern Conference (SoCon) announced an agreement under which sponsorship of men's lacrosse would switch from the ASUN to the SoCon after the 2014 season. Accordingly, Bellarmine lacrosse began SoCon play in the 2015 season.

The ASUN–SoCon lacrosse partnership took a new form after the 2021 season when the ASUN reinstated its men's lacrosse league. Bellarmine was joined in the revived ASUN league by five new single-sport members—Air Force, which also moved from SoCon lacrosse; Detroit Mercy, previously a single-sport member of the Metro Atlantic Athletic Conference; and three of the four 2021 independents in Cleveland State, Robert Morris, and Utah. The other full ASUN member with men's lacrosse, Jacksonville, remained in SoCon men's lacrosse.

A men's lacrosse realignment triggered by the expectation and ultimate announcement of a new Atlantic 10 Conference men's lacrosse league led to the shuttering of SoCon men's lacrosse after the 2022 season. Jacksonville returned to ASUN men's lacrosse, and full SoCon member and current ASUN beach volleyball associate Mercer added men's lacrosse to its ASUN membership. Former GLVC member Lindenwood, which joined the D-I Ohio Valley Conference (which does not sponsor lacrosse) in July 2022, also joined ASUN men's lacrosse.

=== Basketball ===
Men's basketball has been a part of Bellarmine's athletic department since the school's founding in 1950. That same year student Ted Wade became the first black player on an integrated college basketball team in Kentucky. The basketball program has been coached by 11 different men and is currently headed by Louisville native Scott Davenport. Davenport is one of two Bellarmine coaches who have also guided teams to Kentucky's high school championship, both doing so with Louisville schools. He did it in 1988 at Ballard High. The other coach who moved up to the college level was Joe Reibel, who won with St. Xavier High in 1962. Reibel is Bellarmine's winningest coach with a record of 346–277. A unique Bellarmine coach was Bob Valvano. Valvano is an ESPN personality and was a member of Mensa, an international organization for only the brightest two percent of people on Earth. Arguably the most famous Bellarmine coach was Alex Groza, the Fabulous Five (Kentucky Wildcats) great at the University of Kentucky. Groza was an All-American, Gold Medal winner in the 1948 London Olympics and first team NBA.

In its history, the Knights have won five GLVC men's basketball titles and four NCAA Midwest Regional titles. On March 26, 2011, the Knights won its first NCAA Division II National Championship, led by guards Jeremy Kendle and Braydon Hobbs. The Knights defeated BYU–Hawaii for the title, 71–68. The championship game aired on national television on the CBS network. An estimated 2,906 fans were in attendance for the championship game, most of which were Bellarmine fans who made the 900-mile (1,400 km) trip from Louisville to watch the Knights compete in the championship held in Springfield, Massachusetts at the MassMutual Center.

=== Swimming and diving ===
In 2012, Bellarmine University announced the start of its swimming program.

=== Track and field ===
Headed by Coach Chase Broughton

=== Sprint football ===
Bellarmine announced in June 2021 that it would add sprint football as a varsity sport effective in 2022–23. Sprint football is played under standard college football rules, but players can be no heavier than 178 pounds (81 kg) with a minimum of 5% body fat at the team's official weigh-in. The Knights play in the Midwest Sprint Football League, which launched in 2022 with six members and now has five. Sprint football is not governed by the NCAA, but is fully incorporated into the Bellarmine Athletics Department.

The Knights play home games at Brother Thomas More Page Stadium on the nearby campus of Saint Xavier High School.
