= Dennis H. Holtschneider =

American academic administrator

Dennis Holtschneider
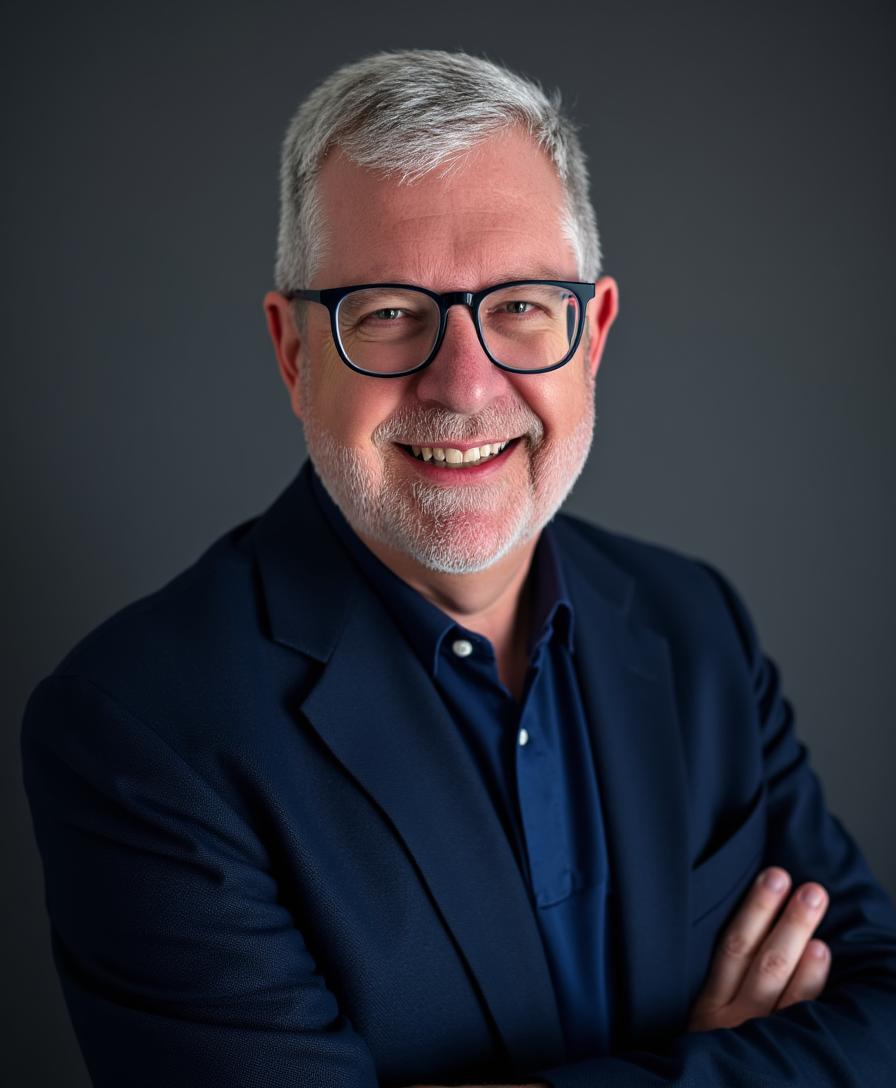
- Holtschneider in 2026

Principal, Nygren Consulting
- Incumbent
- Assumed office 2024

11th President of DePaul University
- In office July 1, 2004 – June 30, 2017
- Preceded by: John P. Minogue
- Succeeded by: A. Gabriel Esteban

Personal details
- Born: Dennis Henry Holtschneider; January 14, 1962 (age 64) Detroit, Michigan, U.S.
- Education: Niagara University; Mary Immaculate Seminary; Harvard University

Dennis Henry Holtschneider (born January 14, 1962) is principal at Nygren Consulting and most recently served as president of the Association of Catholic Colleges and Universities with his term ending June 30, 2024.

Previously, he was the executive vice president and chief operations officer for Ascension Health, serving from July 2017 through June 2019. Prior to this, he served as president of DePaul University in Chicago, United States, serving from July 2004 through June 2017.

== Early life ==
A native of Detroit, Michigan, he is a 1985 graduate of Niagara University with a bachelor's degree in mathematics; a 1997 doctorate in higher education administration from Harvard University Graduate School of Education; and a certificate in health care strategy from the Harvard Business School in 2018. From 1982-2026, Holtschneider was a member of the Congregation of the Mission, an order of Catholic priests founded by St. Vincent de Paul and commonly referred to as Vincentians.

== Career ==
Holtschneider served as executive vice president and chief operating officer of Niagara University from 2000 to 2004. He taught and served in several academic administrative roles at St. John's University between 1996 and 1999.

Holtschneider was the director and rector of Vincentian College Seminary in Ozone Park, New York, from 1989 to 1992. Since 2008, he has been a faculty member in the Harvard Graduate School of Education, teaching seminars and institutes on strategy, governance and management development, among others. He taught summer institutes on strategic planning at the Villanova University Center for the Study of Church Management from 2006 to 2010. He served also as clinical associate professor of higher education in the Graduate School of Education at the University at Buffalo.

In 2004, he was named president of DePaul University, where he served until 2017. He is the co-founder of the Institute of Global Homelessness and the co-founder of DePaul Prep High School in Chicago.

== Governance ==
Holtschneider has served in leadership roles on several national advocacy boards for higher education. He joined the American Council on Education's board of directors in 2013, was a trustee for the National Association of Independent Colleges and Universities in 2012–13, and was a trustee for the Association of Catholic Colleges and Universities from 2009 to 2015, including serving as chair of that board from 2010 to 2012. He spent five years as a member of the school board for Chicago Catholic Schools (2009–14) and nine years as a trustee of the Chicago History Museum (2007–2016), where he remains a life trustee. Holtschneider currently serves on the boards of Teachers College Columbia University, Grant Park Music Festival, the United Board for Christian Education in Asia, and the Institute of Global Homelessness.

== Honors and affiliations ==
Holtschneider holds 18 honorary degrees. In 2026, he received the Rev. Theodore Hesburgh Award for leadership in Catholic Higher Education and in 2024, the Henry Paley Memorial Award for Leadership in U.S. Private Higher Education. In 2015, he received the American Council on Education’s Council of Fellows Mentor Award, recognizing his guidance in preparing the next generation of academic leaders in higher education.

In 2012, he was noted as one of Diversity MBA Magazine's "Top 100 under 50 Diverse Executive Leaders". In 2011, he was honored by the Archdiocese of Chicago with its "Strangers No Longer Award" for his leadership on comprehensive immigration reform.

== Publications ==
Holtschneider has conducted research and written extensively on higher education strategy and governance.

Trusteeship Magazine published his article, "Strategic Capacity: Strengthening University Boards to Govern Strategy" in its November/December 2016 issue. His chapter on "Raising Academic Quality: A Playbook", appeared in Strategies for University Management in 2016. His chapter "Strategy" appeared in the 2015-16 Presidential Perspectives Higher Education Thought Leadership Series Innovative Concepts to Achieve Campus Transformation.
