= Teresa J. Domzal =

American marketing scholar

Academic background
- Education: Niagara University; University of Cincinnati

Academic work
- Discipline: marketing
- Institutions: George Mason University; Richmond, The American International University in London; National Defense Intelligence College; Office of the Director of National Intelligence

Teresa J. Domzal, from Falls Church, Virginia, is an American professor and scholar who has published many journal articles on marketing and advertising. She has an emphasis in post-modern consumer culture and international advertising.

== Education ==
Domzal received her bachelor's degree from Niagara University, located in New York, and both her master and doctoral degrees from the University of Cincinnati.

== Career ==
In 1998, Domzal was named the dean of George Mason University's School of Management. She also served as a marketing professor who taught courses in advertising and promotional strategy since 1981. In 2001, faculty members established a scholarship at George Mason University in honor of Domzal's parents, Zygmunt and Jane Domzal, for students who are immigrants or first-generation children of immigrants.

She has lectured at colleges and universities around the world. She served as a visiting associate professor at Bond University located in Queensland, Australia, and a guest lecturer at the University of Odense in Denmark, and Erasmus University located in Rotterdam.

In 2001, she attained the position of Dean of the School of Business at Richmond, The American International University in London, located in London. She subsequently served as the provost of the National Defense Intelligence College, now National Intelligence University, hosted by the Defense Intelligence Agency. In 2009 Dr. Domzal joined the staff of the Office of the Director of National Intelligence, coordinating Intelligence Community (IC) training and education issues, working in partnership with the IC's Chief Human Capital Officer and the Chancellor of the National Intelligence University, to establish a common core of knowledge, skills, and abilities and provide a common, IC-wide baseline within and among its professional communities.

== Awards and recognition ==
1993: Won the 'Journal of Advertising Best Article Award' from the American Academy of Advertising for her work, "Mirror, Mirror: Some Postmodern Reflections on Global Advertising."
