= Bellarmine Knights men's lacrosse =

College lacrosse team that represents Bellarmine University

- University: Bellarmine University
- Head coach: Andrew Whitley
- Stadium: Owsley B. Frazier Stadium
- Location: Louisville, Kentucky
- Conference: ASUN Conference
- Colors: Scarlet and silver

The Bellarmine Knights Men's Lacrosse team is a college lacrosse team that represents Bellarmine University in Louisville, Kentucky, United States. The school has been an all-sports member of the ASUN Conference since 2020, but men's lacrosse spent the 2021 season (2020–21 school year) as an associate member of the Southern Conference (SoCon), in which it had competed since the 2015 season. With the reinstatement of ASUN men's lacrosse competition for the 2022 season, Bellarmine moved that sport to its full-time conference home.

Jack McGetrick helped found the Bellarmine Knights lacrosse program in 2004 in anticipation of starting competition in the spring of 2005. He was head coach of the program until he lost his long battle with cancer in October 2010.

In July 2019, Bellarmine University's athletic department named Andrew Whitley the next head coach of the Knights men's lacrosse program.

The revival of ASUN men's lacrosse saw the two full ASUN members with men's lacrosse programs separate, with Bellarmine moving to the ASUN while Jacksonville remained in the SoCon. The Knights were joined in the revived ASUN league by five new associate members—Air Force, Cleveland State, Detroit Mercy, Robert Morris, and Utah.

== History ==
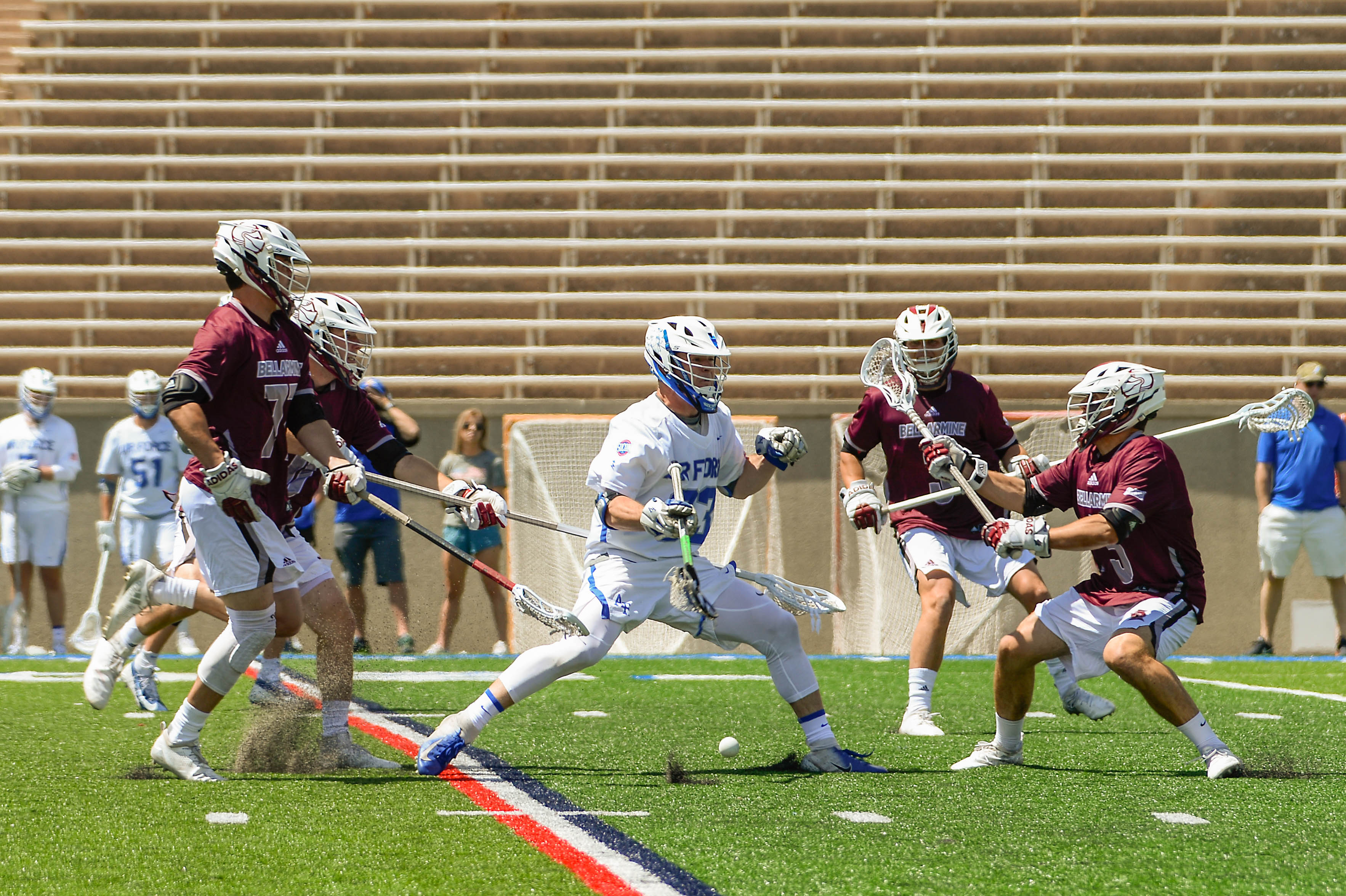
Bellarmine lacrosse players surround an Air Force player during a game in 2019

=== Conference affiliations ===
- Independent (2005–2006)
- GWLL (2007–2009)
- ECAC (2010–2014)
- SoCon (2015–2021)
- ASUN (2022–present)

=== Year by year results ===
Season	Coach	Overall	Conference	Standing	Postseason
2005	Jack McGetrick	13–2			
2006	Jack McGetrick	7–8			
2007	Jack McGetrick	3–10	1–4	5th	
2008	Jack McGetrick	7–7	0–5	6th	
2009	Jack McGetrick	6–8	0–5	6th	
2010	Jack McGetrick	9–6	3–4	5th	
2011	Bart Sullivan	4–11	0–6	7th	
2012	Kevin Burns	4–8	0–4	5th	
2013	Kevin Burns	7–7	3–4	5th	
2014	Kevin Burns	7–5	0–4	5th	
2015	Kevin Burns	4–8	2–4	5th	
2016	Kevin Burns	6–9	4–3	4th	
2017	Kevin Burns	4–9	3–4	T-4th	
2018	Kevin Burns*	4–9	2–5	T-6th	
2019	Jim Mitchell	3–10	3–4	5th	
2020	Andrew Whitley	2–6			
2021	Andrew Whitley	5–10	2–4	T-5th	
2022	Andrew Whitley	4–13	2-3	4th	
2023	Andrew Whitley	11–6	5–4	T-4th	
2024	Andrew Whitley	9–8	5–4	T-4th	
2025	Andrew Whitley	8-9	2-3	4th	

* Jay Sothoron was named the interim head coach with 2 games remaining in the 2018 season.

=== All-time coaching records ===
Head coach	Years	Win–loss–tie	Pct.
Jack McGetrick	2005-2010	45-41	.523
Bart Sullivan	2011 (Interim)	4-11	.267
Kevin Burns	2012-2018	35-54	.393
Jay Sothoron	2018 (Interim)	1-1	.500
Jim Mitchell	2019	3-10	.231
Andrew Whitley	2020–present	36–48	.429
