= Kyle Sorensen =

Canadian lacrosse player (born 1986)

Personal information
- Nationality: Canadian
- Born: June 22, 1986 (age 40) Peterborough, Ontario
- Height: 6 ft 2 in (188 cm)
- Weight: 220 lb (100 kg; 15 st 10 lb)

Sport
- Position: Defense
- NLL draft: 2nd overall, 2006; San Jose Stealth
- NLL team Former teams: Washington Stealth; Calgary Roughnecks
- MLL team: Toronto Nationals
- Pro career: 2006–

Kyle Sorensen (born June 22, 1986) is a Canadian lacrosse player who plays defense for the Washington Stealth of the National Lacrosse League and the Toronto Nationals of Major League Lacrosse. He played for the Peterborough Lakers before the NLL and attended Bellarmine University before he was drafted into the NLL with the second selection of the 2006 NLL Entry Draft.

== Statistics ==
=== NLL ===
		Regular Season						Playoffs
Season	Team	GP	G	A	Pts	LB	PIM	GP	G	A	Pts	LB	PIM
2007	San Jose	15	8	3	11	58	38	2	0	0	0	14	4
2008	San Jose	16	4	8	12	77	55	1	1	2	3	6	0
2009	San Jose	16	4	8	12	97	29	2	0	0	0	13	4
NLL totals		47	16	19	35	232	122	5	1	2	3	33	8
