= Owsley B. Frazier Stadium =

American stadium

Owsley Frazier Stadium
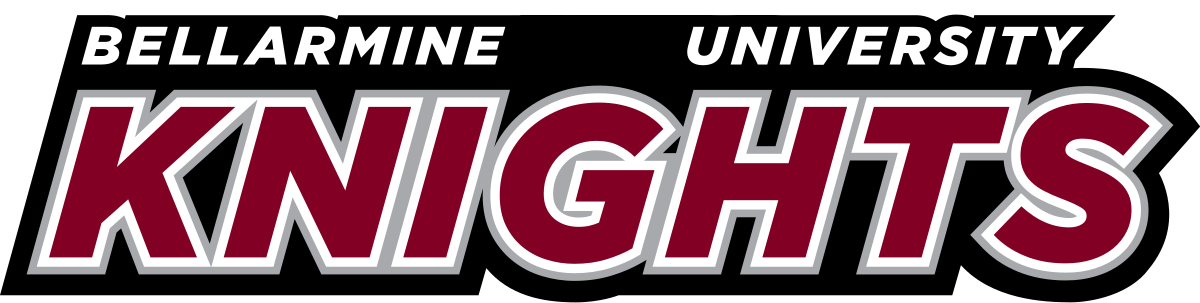

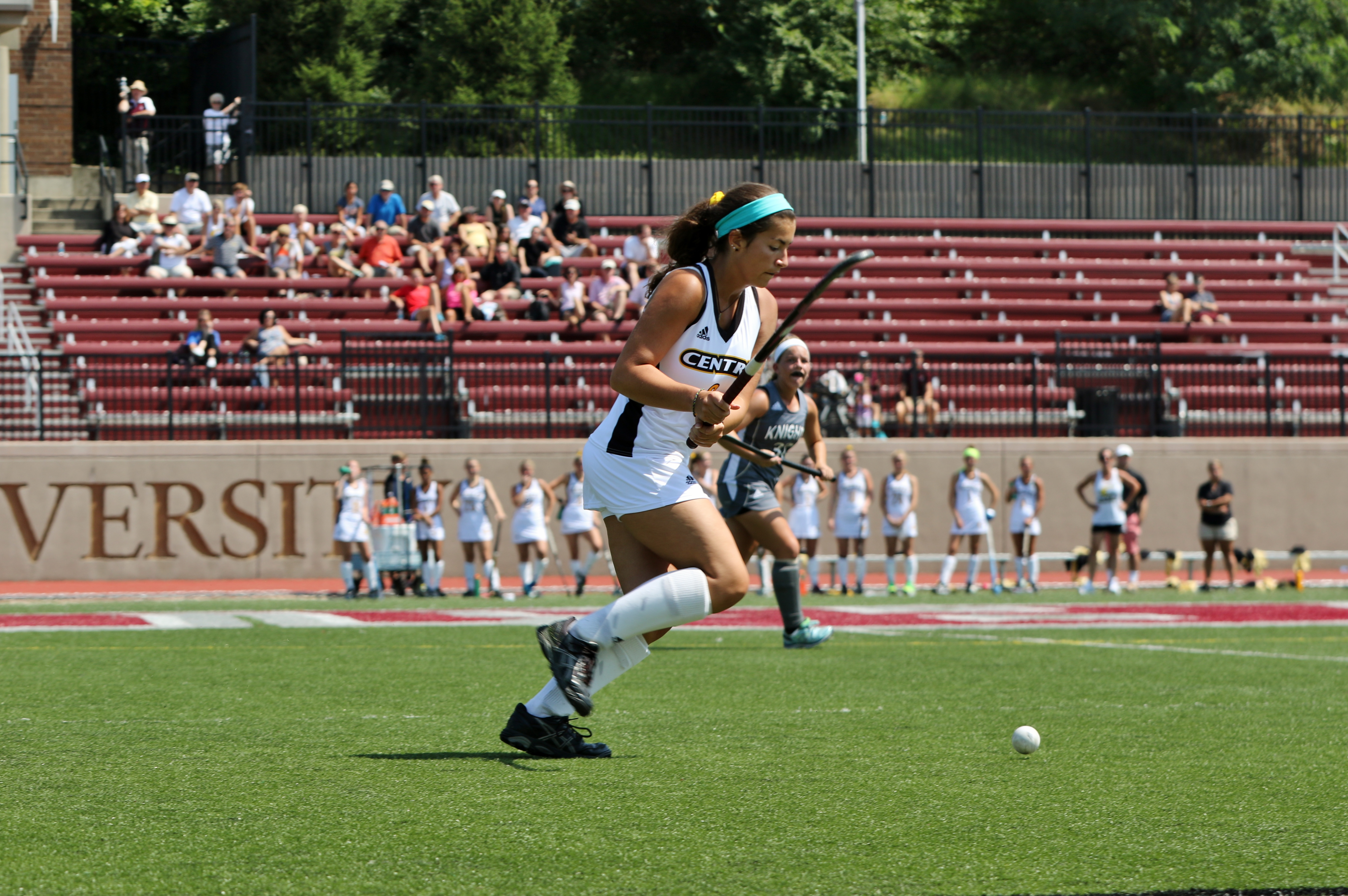
- A field hockey game at the stadium in 2017
- Interactive map of Owsley Frazier Stadium
- Full name: Owsley Brown Frazier Stadium
- Address: 201 Newburg Road; Louisville, KY; United States
- Coordinates: 38.21571°N 85.70322°W
- Owner: Bellarmine University
- Operator: Bellarmine Univ. Athletics
- Capacity: 2,000
- Type: Multi-purpose stadium
- Surface: Artificial turf
- Current use: Soccer; Field hockey Lacrosse; Track and field

Construction
- Opened: August 24, 2007; 19 years ago

Tenants
- Bellarmine Knights (NCAA) teams: men's and women's soccer; men's lacrosse; women's field hockey; track and field

Website
- athletics.bellarmine.edu/owsley-stadium

Owsley B. Frazier Stadium is a multi-purpose stadium on the campus of Bellarmine University in Louisville, Kentucky. The facility serves as home to Bellarmine Knights men's and women's soccer, women's field hockey, men's lacrosse, and track and field teams.

The stadium opened on August 24, 2007, in a Bellarmine Knights women's soccer game, and was officially dedicated on August 28, 2007. Construction took approximately 18 months and was completed at an estimated cost of $5.1 million.

On February 20, 2010, the plaza area of the stadium was named after men's lacrosse coach Jack McGetrick. The plaza houses the locker rooms, concessions, and restrooms for the stadium. McGetrick started the lacrosse program at Bellarmine in 2004 and is well known throughout the lacrosse community.

The stadium is named after Owsley Brown Frazier (1935–2012), a philanthropist who founded the Frazier History Museum.

== Features ==
Owsley B. Frazier Stadium incorporates several innovative features, including:

- Artificial turf. The artificial turf at the stadium has permanent markings for soccer, field hockey, and lacrosse. A complex drainage system is incorporated into the design to allow for play in all weather conditions. The "24/7" artificial field surface is named Joseph P. and Janet A. Clayton Field.
- Stadium lighting. The lighting system features redirected lighting which bends spill lighting back on to the field, drastically reducing the amount of light which will fall outside the stadium's perimeter.
- Track surface. The track is an eight-lane, 400-meter track, featuring three long jump pits, two pole vault areas, a high jump pit, and a steeplechase water jump pit. The surface is a dual-durometer, polyurethane poured surface provided by Beynon Sport Surfaces, the same company which has installed tracks at other top college facilities including at Illinois, Maryland, and Purdue.
