= Alfred F. Horrigan =

Monsignor Alfred F. Horrigan (1914–2005) was the first president of Bellarmine University from 1949 until his resignation in 1972. He was fundamental in establishing the framework for the new university's future success. He, also, was a prominent member of the Louisville community serving in many different capacities within the city from civil rights activist to local pastor.

Msgr. Horrigan was frequently involved in social justice issues and headed the Louisville, Kentucky, Human Relation Commission. He was a friend of Thomas Merton. The preschool at Saint James Elementary School is named after Horrigan.

== Early life ==
Alfred F. Horrigan was born on December 9, 1914, to William Horrigan and Anna Kienle Horrigan. Horrigan had four brothers along with two sisters growing up. For his early education, Alfred went to school at Saint James Catholic Church in Louisville, Kentucky. Horrigan later went to school at Saint Joseph's high school in Rensselaer, Indiana which was later followed by him attending Saint Meinrad Seminary where he received a bachelor's degree. He also received a Ph.D. and a master's degree from The Catholic University of America in Washington, DC.

Horrigan's pastoral career began in 1940 when he served as the associate pastor at Holy Spirit Catholic Church in Louisville, Kentucky. He would later become the assistant pastor at the Cathedral of Assumption in 1944. Alfred Horrigan then served as the pastor at his boyhood church of Saint James.

== Bellarmine years ==
Alfred Horrigan was 35 years old when Archbishop John A. Floersh asked him to become the president of a new university called Bellarmine in 1949. Horrigan and Raymond Treece, who was appointed as vice president, were the two leaders that had been tasked to bring this new school to success. The new school was the first school in Kentucky to welcome anyone regardless of race. The first day of classes was October 3, 1950 which saw the enrollment of one hundred and fifteen students.

Horrigan would serve as president until his resignation in 1972. During his twenty-three years of service at Bellarmine, Alfred Horrigan crafted what would become the modern day Bellarmine University. In 1963, the Thomas Merton Center opened at Bellarmine which was the archives of the works that Thomas Merton had made of his time at the Abbey of Gethsemani. Merton was a friend of Horrigan's which is why his archives are located at Bellarmine University. The archives includes items like his correspondence, books, and art works.

Thomas Merton's works represented the spirit of Bellarmine University when Horrigan was president. Thomas, himself, was a controversial figure that looked towards the eastern religions like Buddhism for some of his writings. Alfred Horrigan stressed the importance of education along with working with other institutions whether they were Catholic institutions or not. In 1966, Horrigan called for greater cooperation between Louisville area institutions in matters of philosophical and theological education classes.

In 1968, Bellarmine merged with Ursuline College in Louisville. By the time of his resignation in 1972, Bellarmine had grown to be a prominent university in the city of Louisville.

== Activities outside of Bellarmine ==
Horrigan was an active member of the Louisville community outside of being a president of Bellarmine. He was a tireless advocate for racial justice during his life. Alfred Horrigan served as vice chairman of the Louisville Human Relations committee, he co-founded the Council of Peacemaking, and was the executive director of the Archdiocesan Commission on Peace and Justice. For his efforts in campaigning for racial justice, he was inducted into the Kentucky Civil Rights Hall of Fame in 2003.

Outside of his work on civil rights, Horrigan did media opportunities as a member of the WHAS 11 panel "The Moral Side of the News". He was the first recipient of Saint Meinrad's Distinguished Alumnus Award, which was conferred upon him in 1990. Alfred Horrigan became a Monsignor in 1955 when Pope Pius XII named Horrigan a domestic prelate.

== Later years and death ==
Alfred Horrigan retired from Saint James Catholic Church in 1997, after which he became a resident of Christopher East Health Care Facility. Later in 2005, Horrigan was moved to the Nazareth Home in Louisville where he would later die that year. He died at the age of 90.
