= Aloysius J. Hogan =

American Jesuit priest and academic administrator

Father Aloysius J. Hogan S.J.
- Born: August 5, 1891; Pennsylvania
- Died: December 17, 1943 (aged 52); Washington, D.C.

Academic background
- Education: Doctor of Philosophy
- Alma mater: Cambridge University

Academic work
- Discipline: Philosophy

Aloysius J. Hogan was a Jesuit priest and president of Fordham University from 1930 until 1936. He was 39 years old when inaugurated president of the university. Before being appointed to Fordham University, Hogan earned a Doctor of Philosophy degree from Cambridge University, taught at Boston College for several years, and was dean of studies at two former Jesuit seminaries, located in Hyde Park, NY and Wernersville, PA. Hogan oversaw the building of Keating Hall, an academic building featuring a clock tower that reaches ninety feat above the hall's parapet. He also had the university's old athletic field, which had since been replaced with a new facility, transformed into a grassy quadrangle called Edwards Parade, and commissioned a marble statue of Jesus Christ, called Christ the Teacher, to be placed in the Keating Hall rotunda. Hogan was born in Pennsylvania in 1891. He died in 1943, at the age of 52.
