= Bellarmine University =

Catholic university in Louisville, Kentucky, US

Coordinates: 38.21980°N 85.70300°W

- Former name: Bellarmine College (1950–2000)
- Motto: In Veritatis Amore (Latin)
- Motto in English: In the Love of Truth
- Type: Private university
- Established: 1950; 76 years ago
- Religious affiliation: Roman Catholic
- Academic affiliations: ACCU; CIC; NAICU; Kentuckiana Metroversity; Space-grant
- Endowment: $61.4 million (2025)
- President: Susan M. Donovan
- Provost: Mark Wiegand
- Students: 3,077 (fall 2025)
- Undergraduates: 2,365 (fall 2025)
- Postgraduates: 712 (fall 2025)
- Location: Louisville, Kentucky, United States
- Campus: Urban (main) 134 acres (0.54 km^{2})
- Colors: Scarlet and Silver
- Nickname: Knights
- Sporting affiliations: NCAA Division I: ASUN Conference; ECAC (field hockey); SoCon (men's wrestling); CCSA
- Mascot: Valor the Knight
- Website: bellarmine.edu
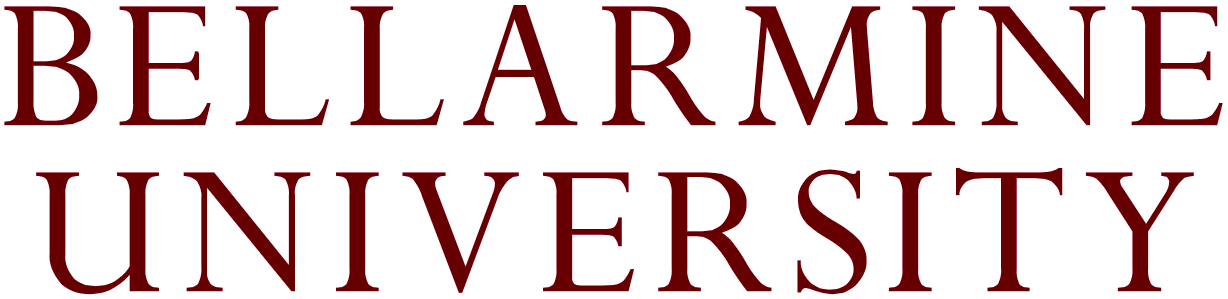

Bellarmine University (/ˈbɛlərmɪn/ BEL-ər-min; BU) is a private Catholic university in Louisville, Kentucky, United States. It opened on October 3, 1950, as Bellarmine College, established by Archbishop John A. Floersh of the Archdiocese of Louisville and named after Saint Robert Bellarmine. In 2000, it became Bellarmine University. The university is organized into seven colleges and schools and confers bachelor's and master's degrees in more than 50 academic majors, along with seven doctoral degrees; it is classified among "D/PU: Doctoral/Professional Universities".

The university has an enrollment of around 3,000 students on its main 134-acre (0.54 km^{2}) academic and residential campus in Louisville's Belknap neighborhood.

Its athletic teams are known as the Knights. Bellarmine is a member of NCAA Division I and competes in the ASUN Conference, with exceptions in: wrestling (Southern Conference), field hockey (Mid-American Conference), and men's and women's swimming & diving (Coastal Collegiate Sports Association). Bellarmine's men's basketball team won the 2011 NCAA Men's Division II Basketball Tournament, the first athletic national championship in school history. In only its second year in Division I, the Bellarmine men's basketball team captured the ASUN Championship in 2022.

== History ==
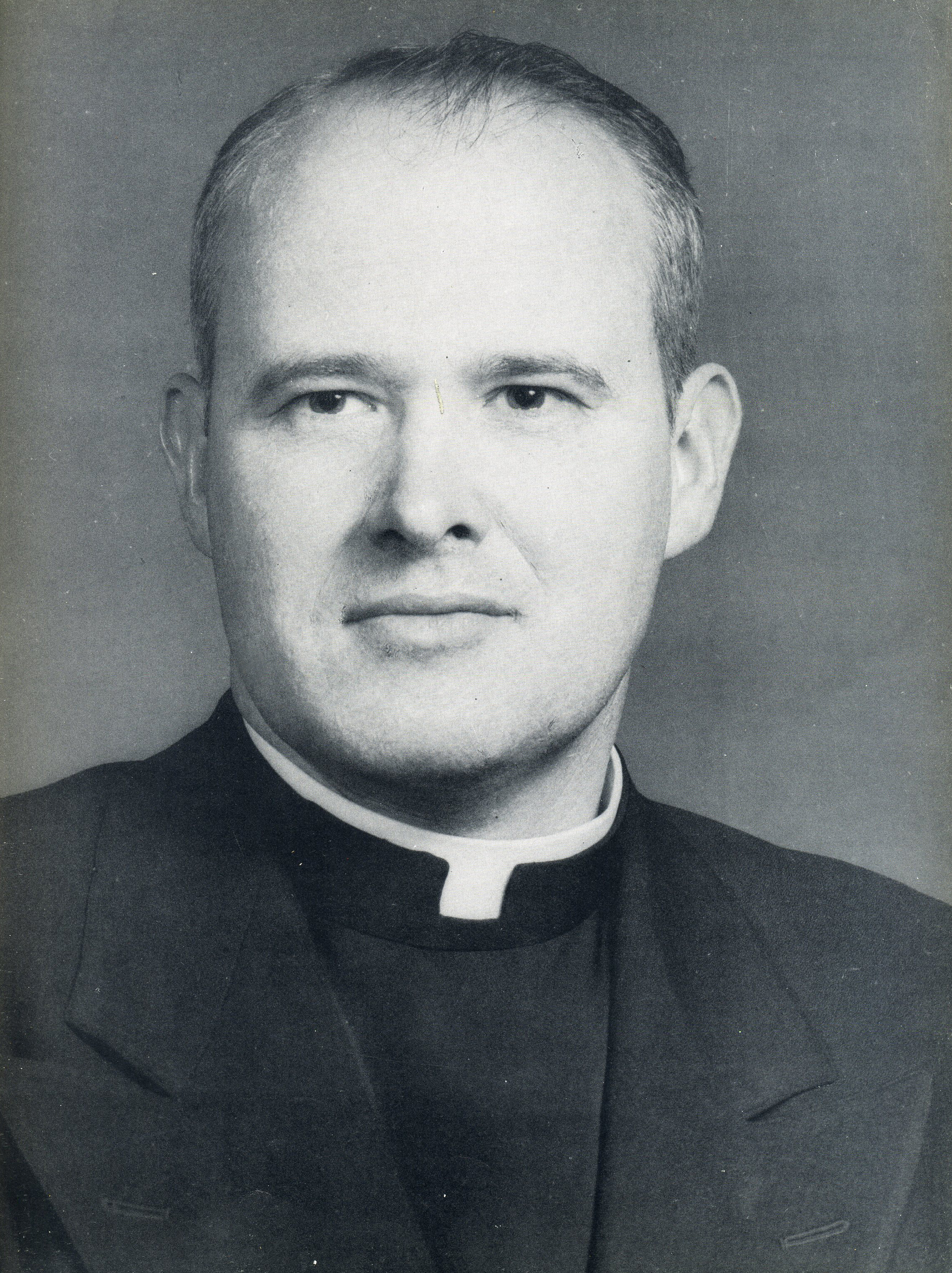
Msgr. Alfred Horrigan, Bellarmine's first president

=== Early history ===
Bellarmine University has been led by four presidents: Alfred Horrigan (1950–1972), Eugene V. Petrik (1973–1990), Joseph J. McGowan (1990–2016), and Susan M. Donovan (2017–present). Horrigan, elevated to Domestic Prelate by the pope in 1955, led the school during its formative years. Petrik strengthened Bellarmine's financial footing. McGowan led the school in a massive building program, culminating in his Vision 2020 plan. Raymond J. Treece served as interim president in 1972–73, between presidents Horrigan and Petrik. John Oppelt served as acting president during McGowan's sabbatical in 1999.

The first important public announcement of the establishment of Bellarmine College was made in November 1949 by the Archbishop of Louisville, John A. Floersh. He selected Horrigan and Treece, associate editors of the Louisville Archdiocesan newspaper, The Record, to begin the school. The two designed a curriculum and the school's core philosophy, taking cues from the Catholic University of America in Washington, D.C., and seeking advice from a number of Catholic institutions, including the University of Notre Dame, the University of Scranton, and the University of St. Thomas in Houston, Texas.

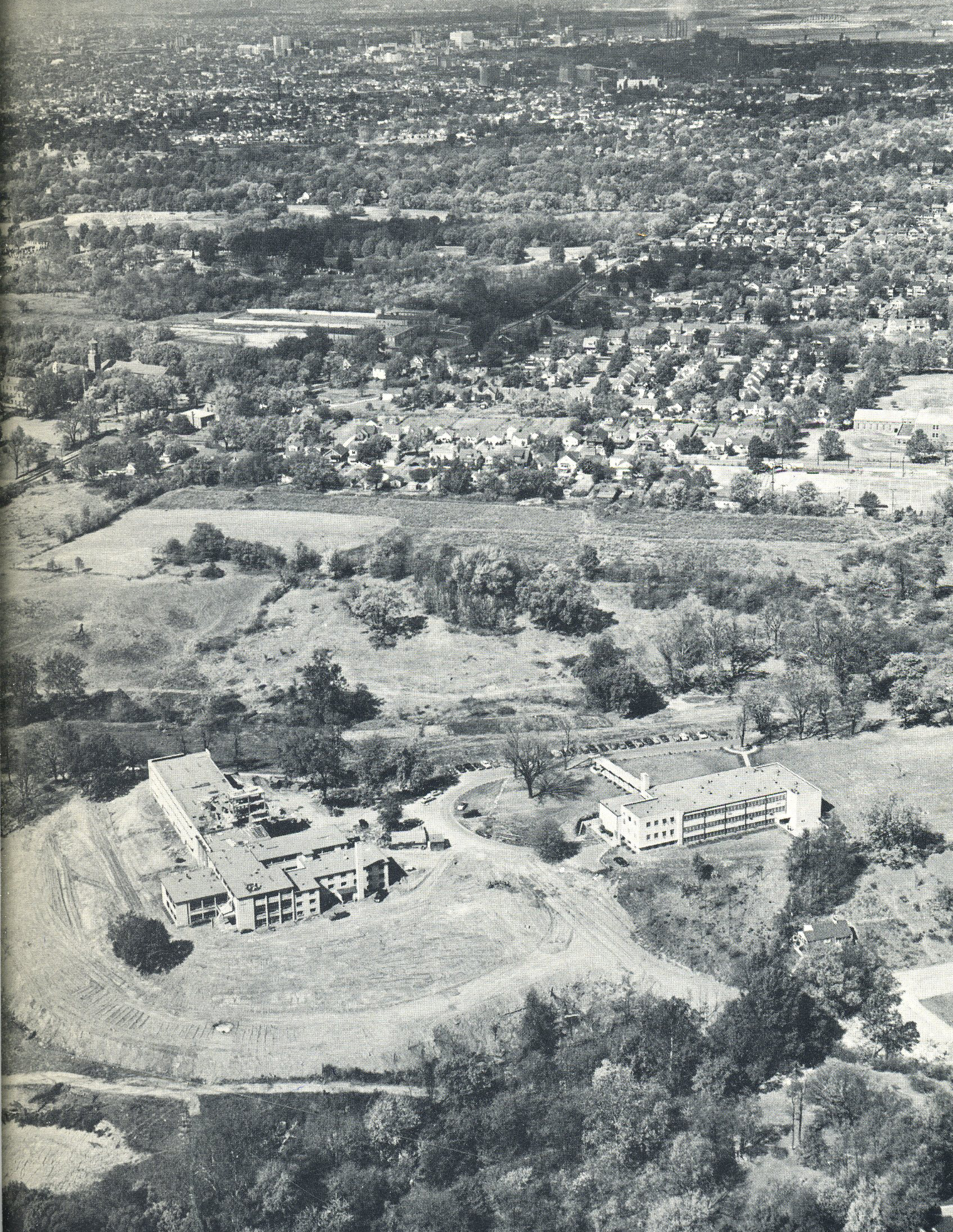
Aerial view of Bellarmine College in 1954

In 1950, the Catholic Archdiocese of Louisville founded Bellarmine College with a pioneer class of 115 freshmen. The only building, Pasteur Hall, was still without its front door on the first day of classes. Archbishop John A. Floersh called the school into existence at its first Convocation, saying, "We are looking forward to the day when the college ranks with the great colleges of our country." From its opening day under founding president Horrigan, Bellarmine welcomed people of all faiths and races. In 1953 the college added the Administration Building (now Horrigan Hall). At its first commencement in 1954, Bellarmine graduated 42 students. The Korean War interrupted or ended the educations of many in the pioneer class, but the school persevered despite rumors of closure. In December 1956, the Southern Association of Colleges and Schools formally announced Bellarmine's accreditation. Enrollment rose from the initial 115 in 1950 to 1,033 in 1959.

=== Expansion and growth ===
The 1960s was an era of growth for the university. The university added Knights Hall, Bonaventure Hall, Lenihan Hall, Newman Hall, Kennedy Hall, an addition to Pasteur Hall and a small student activities building. 1963 witnessed the arrival of students from 17 states and 2 foreign countries. In 1964 the school awarded its 1,000th diploma. By the end of the decade, enrollment exceeded 2,000 and the college installed its first computer.

In 1967, Thomas Merton designated Bellarmine as the official repository of all his manuscripts leading to the formation of Bellarmine's Catholic identity in the inclusive Merton spirit. And in 1968, Bellarmine College merged with Ursuline College, becoming coeducational and independent of the Archdiocese. The college now had its own self-perpetuating board of trustees.

In May 1971, president Horrigan issued a report describing the state of Bellarmine College, especially in light of the Second Vatican Council, noting that the school's board of trustees consisted of representatives from a number of groups, reflecting the "open, progressive, ecumenical and experimental spirit" of that papal council. Also mentioned were various distinctions Bellarmine's students had achieved, including 14 Woodrow Wilson Fellowships, 7 National Science Foundation fellowships, 3 Fulbright Scholars, and 2 Danforth Fellowships and two East-West Fellowships, achievements he attributed to Bellarmine's commitment to excellence.

The college welcomed its second president when Horrigan resigned in 1972. His vice president, Raymond J. Treece, served as interim president for one year. Enrollment had fallen sharply, to 1,306 by 1973, and several years of deficit budgets put the school at risk of closure. The board of trustees appointed Eugene V. Petrik of California to the presidency in 1973 and he quickly began to revitalize the college with new programs and directions. He added the first graduate program – the MBA in 1975 – found resources for marketing and publicity, and brought enrollment back above 2,000. The school also added women's basketball in 1973, and men's soccer and women's volleyball in 1976.

The 1980s saw another decade of growth. Enrollment rose from 2,284 to 2,660. The Brown Activities Center (named for George G. Brown), Wyatt Center for the Arts (named for Wilson W. Wyatt), Norton Fine Arts Complex (named for Jane Morton Norton), Alumni Hall (Humanities Building), and Maurice D.S. Johnson quadrangle (named for former board chair) were added during these years, along with the W. Fielding Rubel School of Business and the Donna and Allan Lansing School of Nursing and Health Sciences (1984). The subject of changing the name of the school from Bellarmine College to Bellarmine University was broached, but it was decided that the school should become a university in fact before it became one in name. More opportunities were added for women to participate in athletics, including softball, track, cross country, tennis and field hockey. A $20 million capital campaign propelled the college into the 1990s.

=== Recent history ===
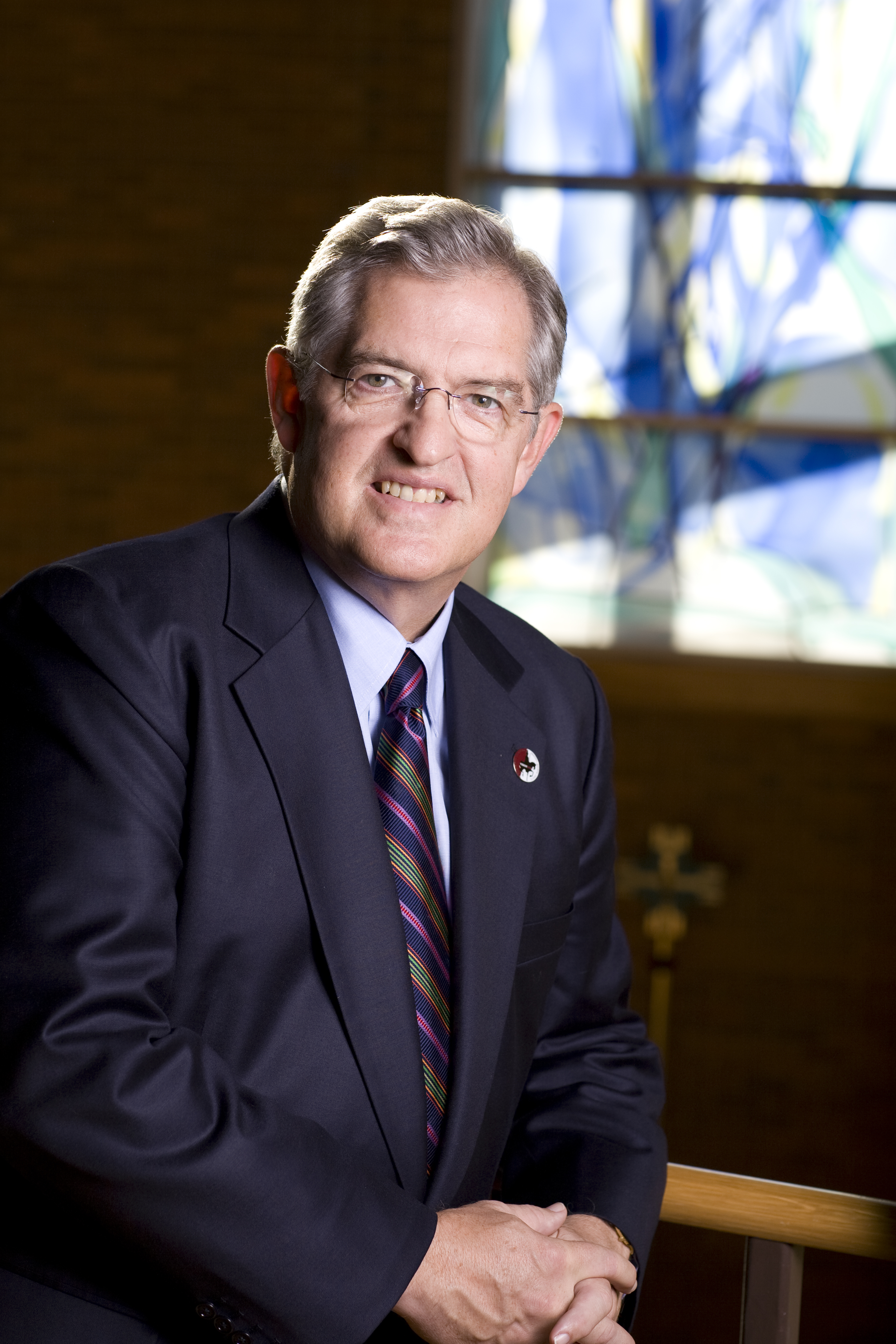
Joseph J. McGowan, long-time Bellarmine president

Joseph J. McGowan, became Bellarmine's third president in 1990. McGowan named buildings on campus for his predecessors, Horrigan and Petrik, and oversaw the addition of Miles Hall and the W.L. Lyons Brown Library. The Annsley Frazier Thornton School of Education was added in 1998 and the college added women's soccer and women's golf. The decade also saw the beginning of Bellarmine's transition from a commuter school to a residential college. In 1995, a record 396 students lived in residence halls. In 1991, McGowan began instituting change in the form of a Five Year Strategic Plan, which later became the Master Plan. In 1994, the school began making perennial appearances in the Princeton Review and U.S. News & World Report, which both list Bellarmine among the top regional universities.

In 2000, the school's 50th anniversary, the board of trustees changed the name from Bellarmine College to Bellarmine University to reflect its status as a Masters-I university. The university's subsequent strategic plan, Vision 2020, called for tripling enrollment, doubling the number of buildings on campus, and adding schools of architecture, law, pharmacy, and veterinary medicine by 2020. In addition, the possibility of moving the remaining athletic programs to NCAA Division I (joining lacrosse) was considered. Acquisitions and renovations continued, including Our Lady of the Woods Chapel, The President's Residence in Glenview, the 2120 Building, the Norton Health Sciences Center (named in honor of Norton Healthcare support), The Siena Residence Halls complex, Owsley B. Frazier Stadium, Joseph A. and Janet P. Clayton Field, Via Cassia and Ponte Juneja, and the expansion of Miles Hall. Enrollment reached a record 2,881 students by 2009, with more than 700 in residence on the campus. Bellarmine launched many new academic programs including The School of Continuing and Professional Studies, the Institute of Media, Culture and Ethics and the School of Communication, The Center for Regional Environmental Studies and Bellarmine Farm.

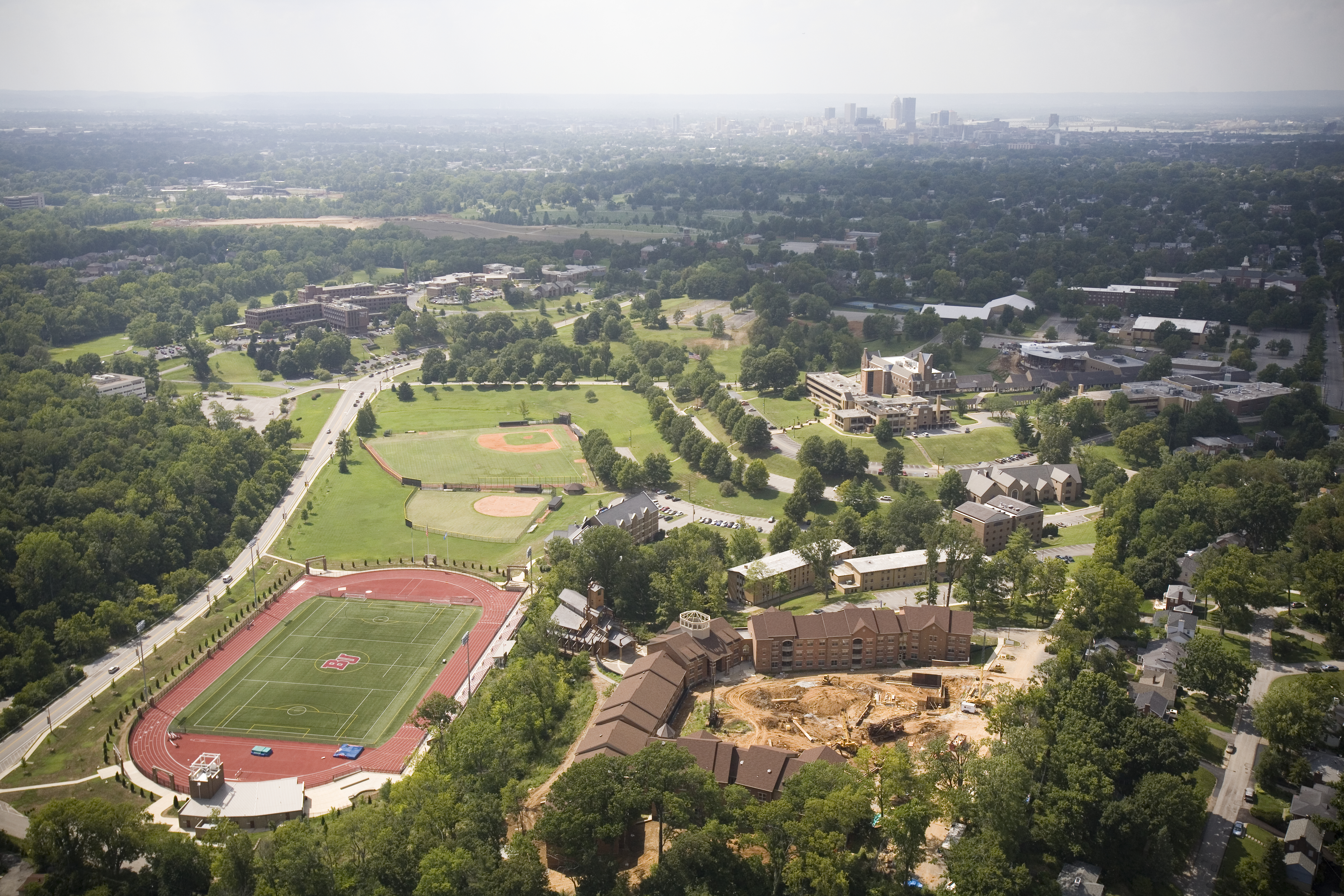
Aerial view of Bellarmine University in 2010

Growth at the university includes 20 new academic programs, a 60% increase in full-time enrollment, and a 56% increase in the number of residential students. The 135-acre (0.55 km^{2}) campus was expanded from 15 buildings in 1990 to 40 buildings, winning 11 architectural awards. Future plans include a new life fitness and recreation center with an Olympic pool, and Bellarmine Centro, a campus center to be anchored by an extensively remodeled Horrigan Hall connected to three new buildings.

McGowan died on March 1, 2016. Bellarmine's executive vice president, Doris Tegart, was appointed the university's interim president, with a national search planned for a new president.

In February 2017, the board of trustees unanimously selected Susan M. Donovan as the university's fourth president. She assumed the presidency on June 1, 2017, following a long career at Loyola University Maryland. Under Donovan's tenure, the school cut nearly a dozen majors. In May 2023, the faculty held a vote of no confidence in President Donovan, citing the school's "dire fiscal realities" and the president's "poor financial decisions".

== Academics ==
Academic rankings

National
- U.S. News & World Report: 280
- Washington Monthly: 331

Bellarmine is accredited by the Southern Association of Colleges and Schools (SACS). The Bellarmine W. Fielding Rubel School of Business is accredited by AACSB. Bellarmine offers more than 50 majors in the arts and sciences, business, communication, education, nursing and health sciences. The university comprises seven colleges and schools.

Bellarmine also offers a study abroad program.

Bellarmine College of Arts & Sciences

Bellarmine College is the home to departments that support undergraduate and graduate degrees in the fine and performing arts, the humanities, and natural and social sciences.

Annsley Frazier Thornton School of Education

In 1998, Bellarmine's department of education was dedicated as the "School of Education". Three years later in 2001 it was named the Annsley Frazier Thornton School of Education (AFTSE). The school offers 20 different programs, including a doctorate in education and social change.

College of Health Professions

The College of Health Professions supports an undergraduate program in Health and Aging Services, a Master's in Health Science with emphases in health care leadership and biomedical sciences, and an online doctoral program in Health Professions Education.
On November 9, 2023, Bellarmine University, and Norton Healthcare announced the nation's first fellowship in neurologic physical therapy.

Donna and Allan Lansing School of Nursing and Health Sciences

The Lansing School is home to undergraduate programs in nursing, medical laboratory science, respiratory therapy and radiation therapy, as well as online graduate programs in nursing and health sciences.

School of Movement and Rehabilitation Sciences

The School of Movement and Rehabilitation Sciences houses the academic departments of exercise science, athletic training and physical therapy.

School of Continuing and Professional Studies

Bellarmine's School of Continuing and Professional Studies offers a variety of stimulating professional development and non-credit courses, designed to provide intellectual, cultural, personal enrichment and professional development for learners of all ages.

Study abroad

Bellarmine offers study abroad options on six continents in over 50 countries around the globe, ranging from departmental programs to summer enclave programs and semester or academic year exchanges at over 150 partner universities. Study abroad is available not only for foreign language students but for all other academic areas as well, and it is accessible to all students regardless of social and economic background. More than 35% of Bellarmine's full-time students engage in an international experience during their tenure at Bellarmine.

== Campus facilities ==
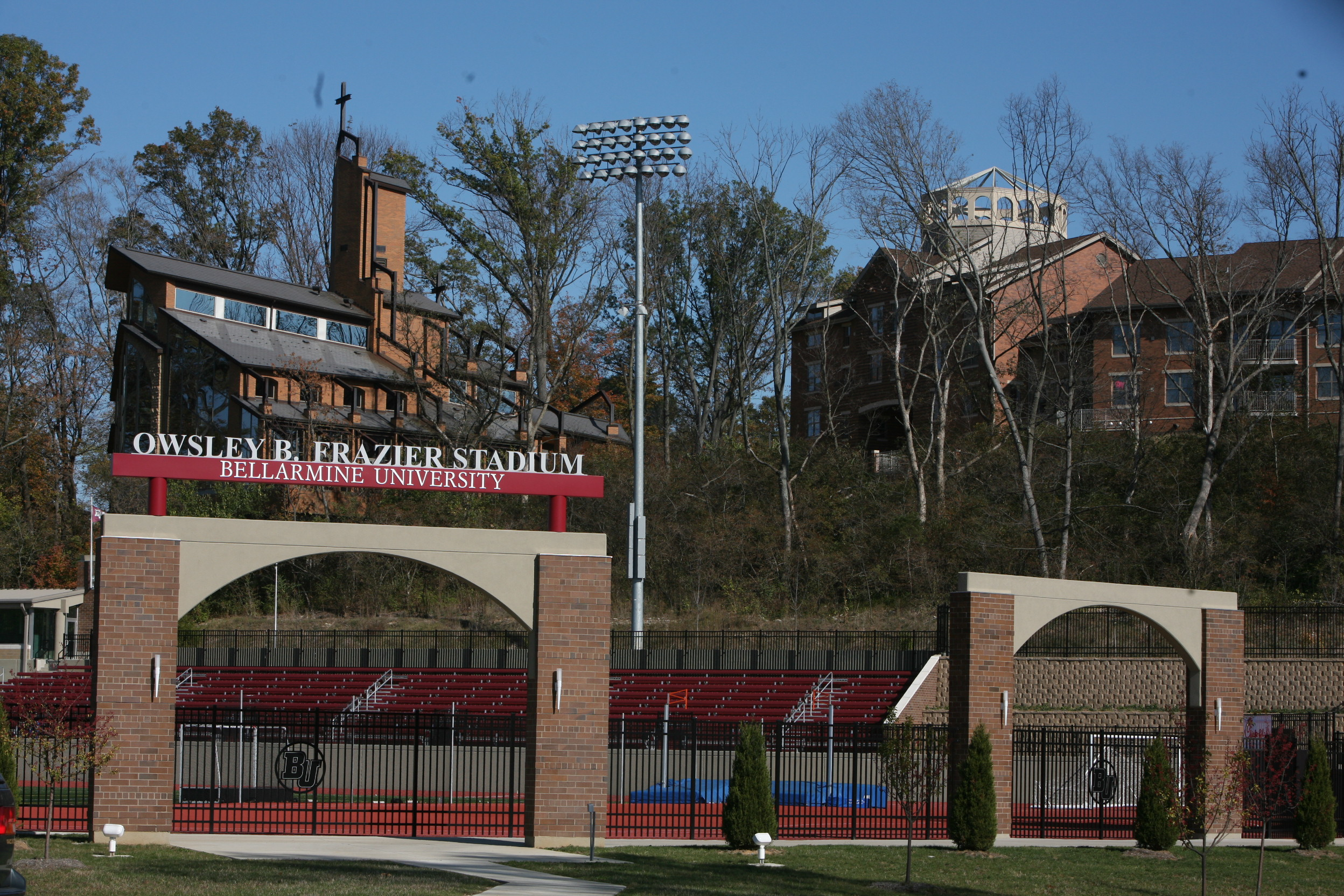
Owsley B. Frazier Stadium, Our lady of The Woods Chapel & Siena Complex at Bellarmine University

Over 40 buildings stand on the hills of Bellarmine's 135-acre (0.55 km^{2}) campus in Louisville's Belknap neighborhood, at the western edge of the larger Highlands area.

=== The Owsley B. Frazier Stadium ===
The multi-purpose stadium serves as home to Bellarmine's soccer, field hockey, lacrosse, and track and field teams. The stadium opened on August 24, 2007, in a Bellarmine Knights women's soccer game, and was officially dedicated on August 28. Construction took approximately 18 months and cost $5.1 million. The stadium features Joseph P. and Janet A. Clayton Field, which is composed of artificial turf with permanent markings for soccer, field hockey and lacrosse games. Surrounding the field is an eight-lane, 400 meter track. The track has a dual-durometer, polyurethane poured surface provided by Beynon Sport Surfaces, a company that has installed tracks at other college facilities including Illinois, Maryland, and Purdue.

=== Our Lady of The Woods Chapel ===
The chapel was dedicated on May 11, 2001, as a place of worship for Bellarmine students. Alfred Horrigan, the original president of Bellarmine University, always dreamed of building a chapel on campus. Although the project was not completed under his presidency, his vision for the chapel was respected during construction. Construction for Our Lady of the Woods was completed under Joseph McGowan's presidency and stands in memory of Archbishop of Louisville John A. Floersh, who founded Bellarmine in 1950. Although construction was completed in 2001, Alfred Horrigan did not consider the project complete until he published the book Our Lady of the Woods Chapel just before his death in 2005. The interior building has two large stained glass windows, designed by Guy Kemper, an artist from Lexington, KY. The stained glass windows reflect different colors depending on the season and weather. On a bright day, you are more likely to see the blue and white reflections while the gray and lead are reserved for winter weather. The green and yellow of the stained glass are evident through most of the seasons with the exception of winter when the bare branches cast an illusion of intermingling with the lead. The majestic purple is always present, allowing visitors focus and peace. Stations of the Cross can be seen etched into the walls of the chapel. They depict the 14 stops that Jesus made on his way to the cross where He was crucified. Outside of the chapel is the Grotto. It is located down the steps that lead to a little nook tucked away beneath the chapel. There you'll find a wall of candles surrounding a statue of Our Lady of Lourdes. Bellarmine provides candles to give students, staff, and alumni a chance to light a candle and meditate.

The surrounding community celebrates Mass in the chapel on Sundays and holy days of obligation, and uses the chapel for retreats and interfaith services. Because it does not have parish status, its use is restricted. No weddings, baptisms, or funerals are held there. There is no "Our Lady of the Woods" in Catholic tradition. The statue in the chapel is actually Our Lady of Grace. Bellarmine College's earliest administrators had a particular devotion to Mary and suggested the chapel be named for her. Because of its setting, the chapel committee chose the name "Our Lady of the Woods".

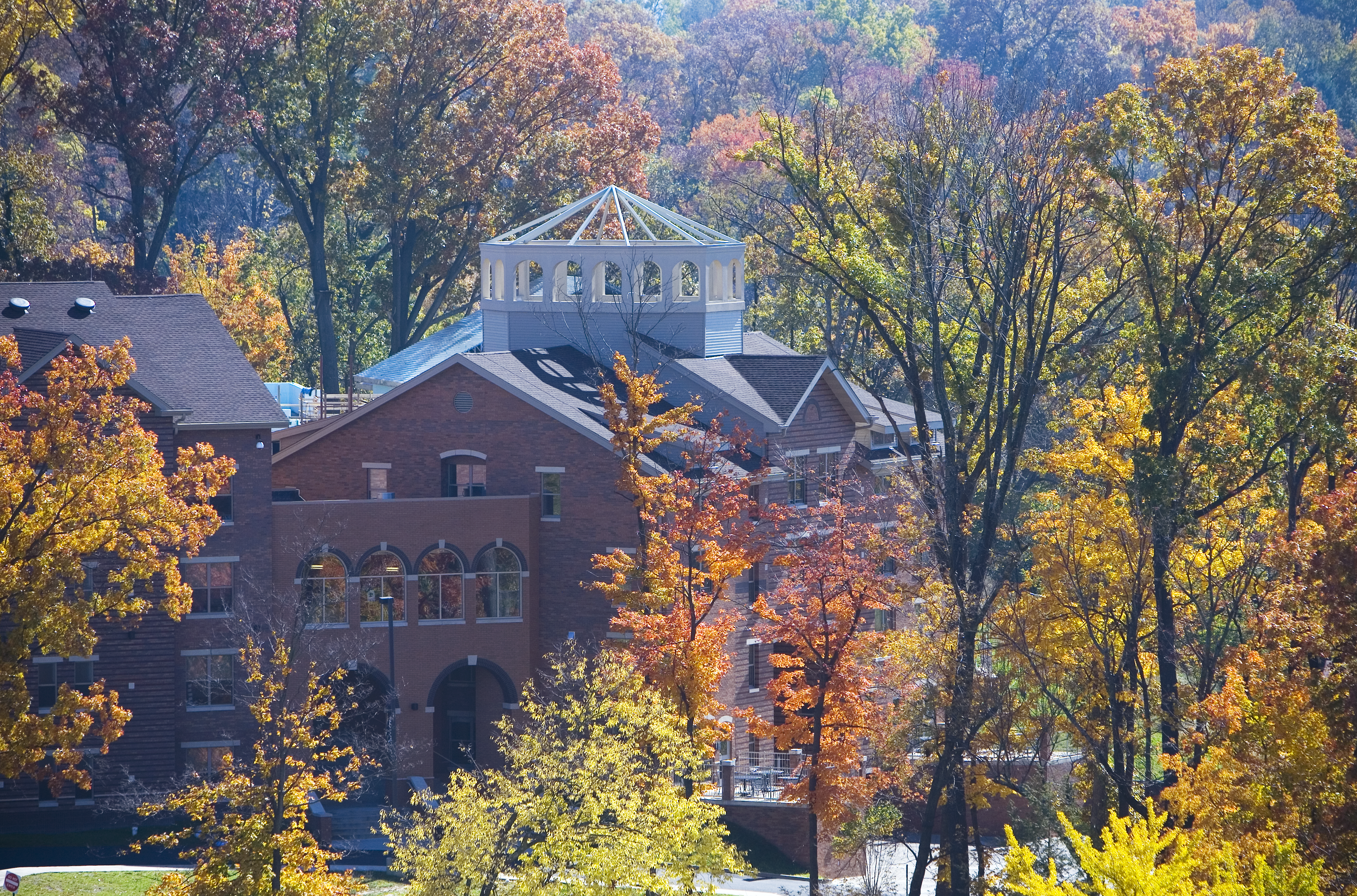
Bellarmine's Siena Complex

=== Siena Complex ===
The Siena Complex is composed of four residence halls: Siena Primo, Siena Secondo, Siena Terzo and Siena Quarto. The complex is modeled after the Piazza del Campo, the main town center of Siena, Italy. Bellarmine's namesake, St. Robert Bellarmine, was a native of Tuscany, where Siena is. The Siena buildings were built by F.W. Owens Co. Inc. and designed by Godsey Associates Architects Inc. They have private restrooms, wireless Internet access, kitchens, balconies, laundry facilities, group study spaces, lobby gathering areas, and a 200-seat dining hall. When completed, the four buildings will enclose a landscaped courtyard with fountains, a small amphitheater and possibly bocce courts. The Siena Housing Project is a project to have half of the school's undergraduate population live on campus. Cumulatively, the Siena Complex will house 519 students and cost $33.6 million.

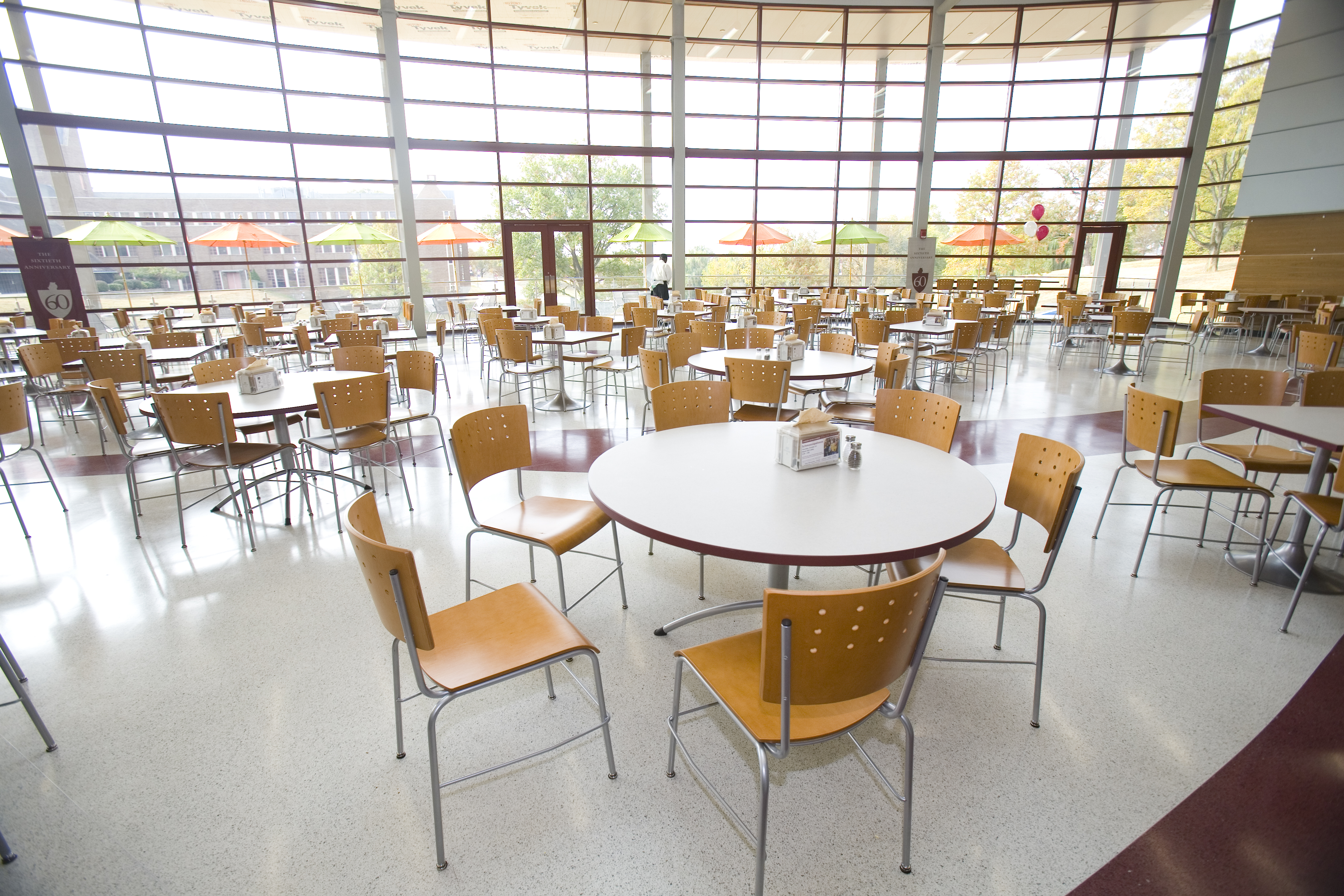
The interior of the University Dining Hall at Bellarmine University

=== University Dining Hall ===
In 2010 Bellarmine opened a new 540-seat, 21,500-square-foot (2,000 m^{2}) dining hall. It features indoor and outdoor seating areas with a 25-foot (7.6 m) tall panoramic window that provides natural light and view of rolling hills. It was built as part of a $7.5 million overhaul of the George G. Brown Center, which also includes a renovated and expanded School of Communication and the Amelia Brown Frazier Convocation Hall. The dining hall is managed by Sodexo Inc., which operated the previous cafeteria.

=== Knights Hall ===
Knights Hall is home to Bellarmine's volleyball team and men's wrestling team; the men's and women's basketball teams practice in Knights Hall but play in Louisville's Freedom Hall as of 2020. The arena was built in 1960 and can seat up to 2,196 fans. It is also used for high school games, graduation ceremonies, and concerts. The hall was dedicated in 1960 with a home game against the University of Louisville and has hosted matchups with rival and NAIA national champion Kentucky State, Fly Williams and his teams from Austin Peay, and the Knights women's basketball regional championship games of the 1990s. The Bellarmine men's basketball team won back-to-back NCAA Division II Midwest Regional Tournaments in 2011 and 2012 at Knights Hall, and then again in 2015 and 2017. The women's basketball team hosted the NCAA Division II Great Lakes Regional Tournament in the venue in 1986 and 1990, both of which were won by the Knights. In December 2010, Knights Hall played host to the quarterfinal, semifinal, and national championship matches of the NCAA Division II Women's Volleyball Championship. Concordia-St. Paul defeated Tampa in four sets to capture their fourth consecutive volleyball title. The arena has also hosted some very special guests including Mother Teresa, the Grateful Dead, Jimmy Buffett and Pete Rose, among others. In 2007, Knights Hall was featured on ESPN when NBA greats such as Bill Walton, Darrell Griffith, and Kenny Walker judged the McDonald's High School All-American Slam Dunk Contest. Additional speakers in the venue include Salman Rushdie (2005), Bob Woodward (2007), and Wendell Berry (2007).

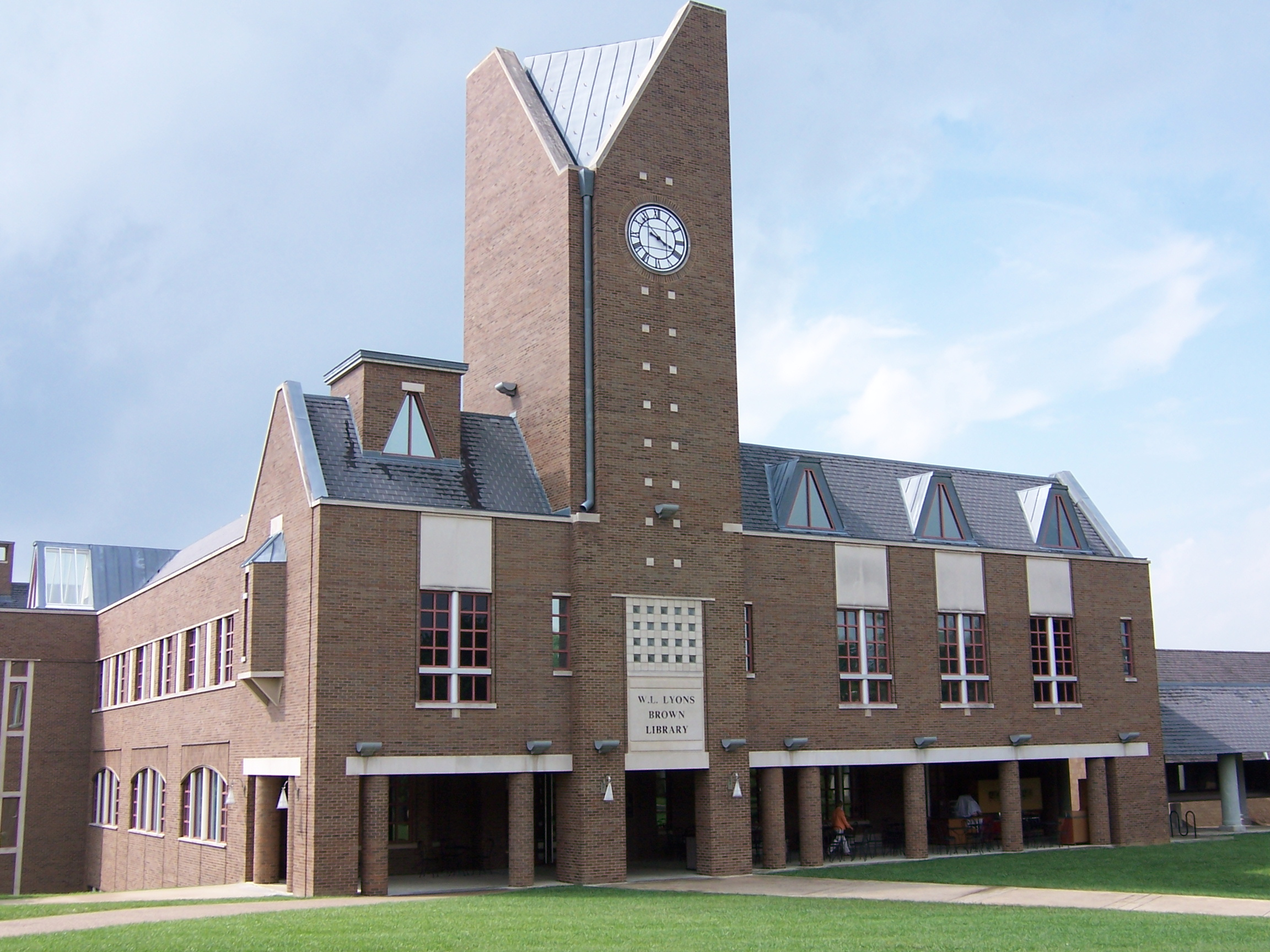
The W.L. Lyons Brown Library, home of the Thomas Merton Center

=== The W.L. Lyons Brown Library ===
The campus library was completed in the fall of 1996, costing $6.5 million. Its exterior is made up of brown brick, anodized aluminum-frame windows and slate roofs. It has long spanning brick arches with vertical piers, limestone columns and banding, steep sloping roofs, and a clock tower marking the entry, establishing a focal point on campus.

The library supports 150,000 volumes and includes a print and electronic-based reference center, micro forms, media services, periodicals, general collections, and a special-collections center. It houses the campus computer center and is wired throughout to promote flexibility in computer usage.

=== Eddie Weber Tennis Complex & SuRF Center ===
The Eddie Weber Tennis Complex was dedicated on September 12, 2009, and is adjacent to the Student Recreation and Fitness Center (SuRF). The courts are named for Eddie Weber, the only man to have been a head coach for both the University of Louisville and Bellarmine. The complex houses 6 outdoor tennis courts with 3 additional indoor courts in the SuRF Center. Inside the SuRF Center are two multi-purpose basketball courts, the exercise and fitness area, locker rooms, and offices. The fitness area is supplied with treadmills, bikes, elliptical weight machines, and free weights.

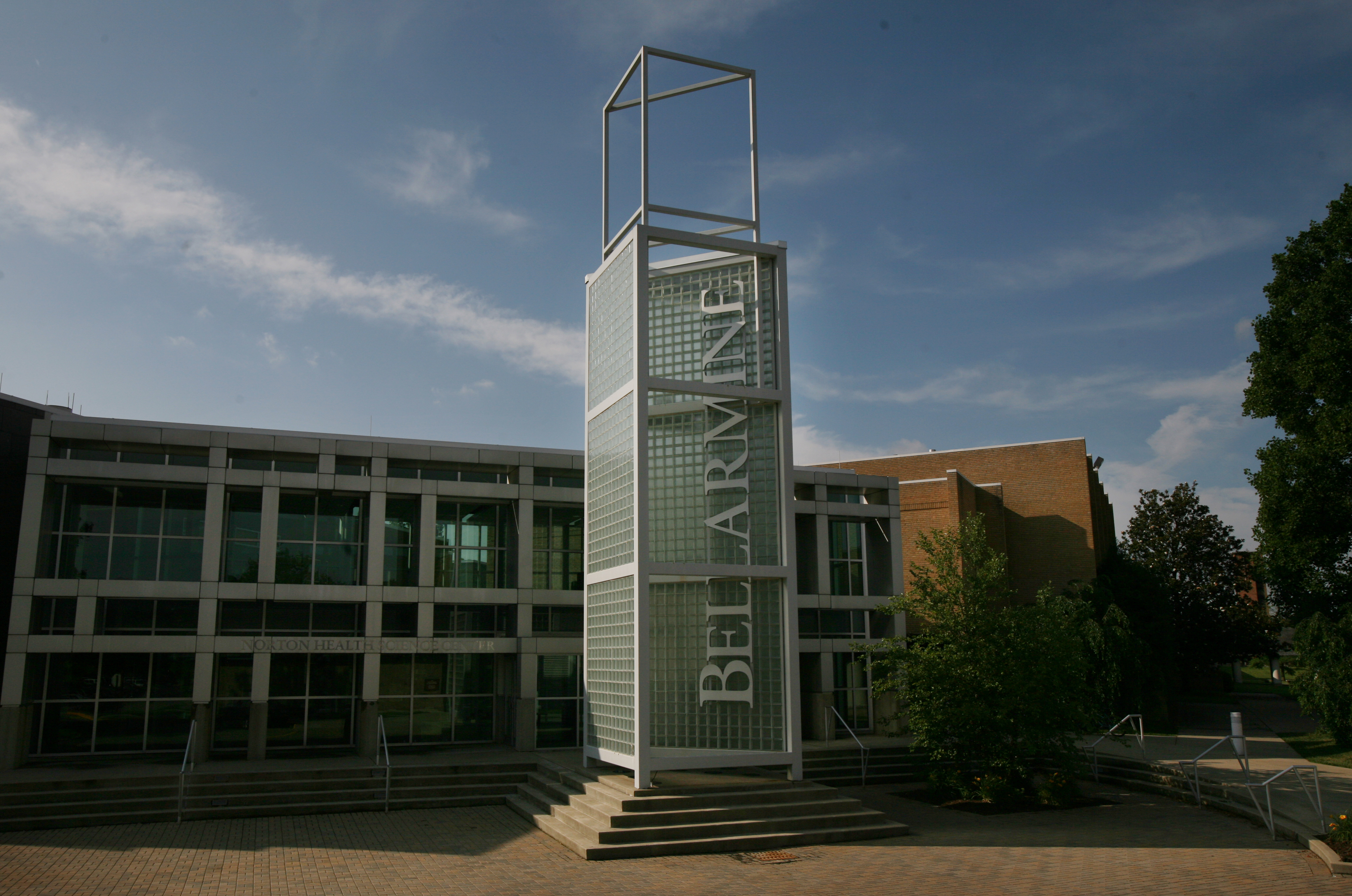
The Norton Health Science Center at Bellarmine University

=== Norton Health Science Center ===
Bellarmine's main science and research facility is the Norton Health Science Center (NHSC). NHSC was completed in 2004 and has 30,000 sq ft (2,800 m^{2}) of floor space. The floor space is divided into laboratories, faculty offices and classrooms. The facility also includes a courtyard for the science quadrangle. NHSC cost $6.5 million to build and was funded primarily by private donations.

=== Horrigan Hall ===
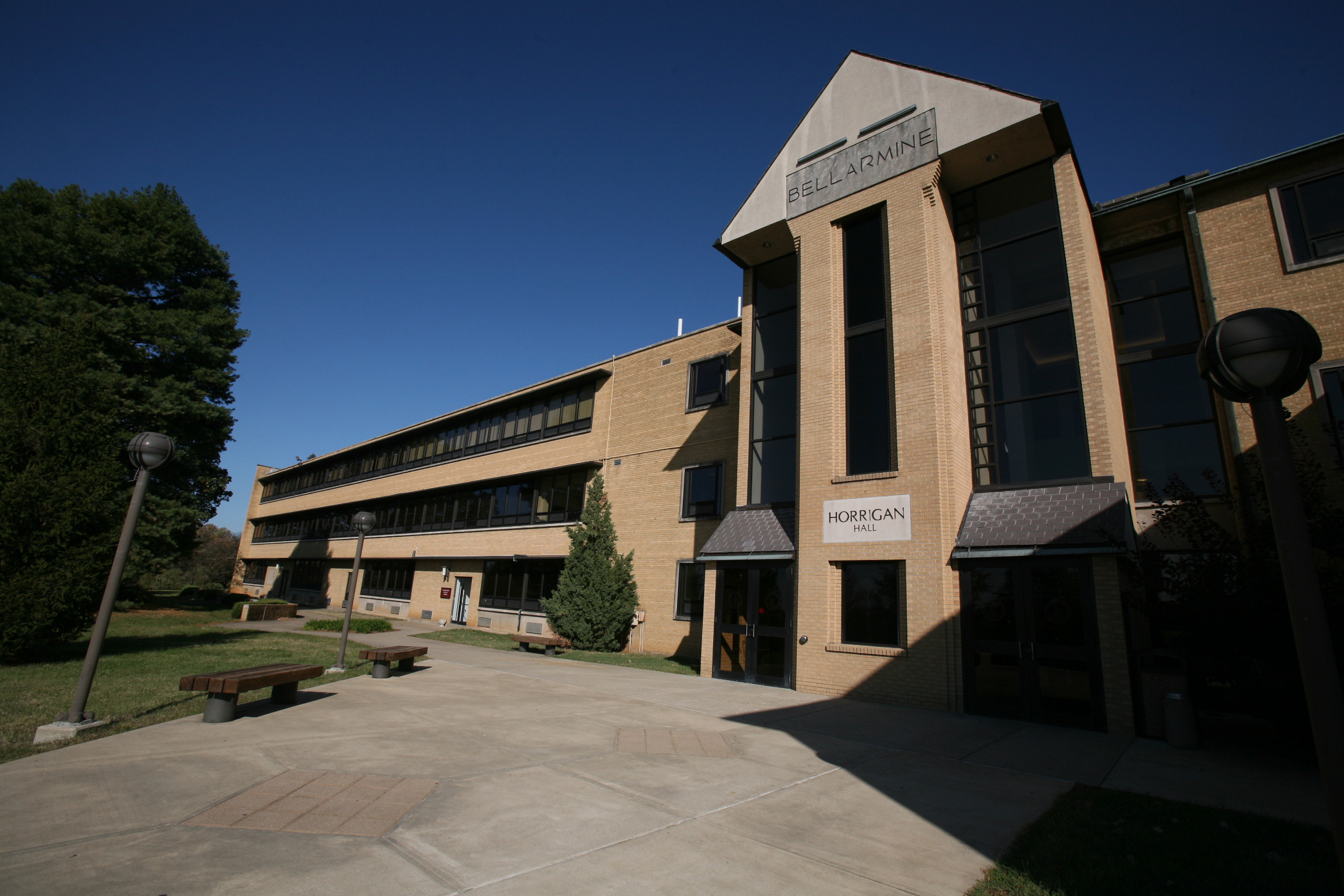
Bellarmine's Horrigan Hall

Horrigan Hall is named after the university's first president, Alfred Horrigan, and serves as the campus center. Architects Thomas J. Nolan & sons designed the facility in "modern" 1950s style and Al J. Schneider Company was the general contractor. The exterior is of rough textured brick with limestone trim. The three-story building sits atop a hill on campus featuring a six-story tower. Originally known as the Administration Building, Horrigan Hall was constructed in February 1953, costing $1 million. The facility was completely funded by private donations. Horrigan Hall has gone through a few remodeling and upgrades over the years. In December 1961 a new sound system was added, with central air following in 1970. In 1986–87 an elevator was installed and a new 2001 Newburg Road entrance was added as an alternative to the original 2000 Norris Place street entrance. Further remodeling and expansion is planned. Three new buildings have been proposed in front of and connected to the existing hall. The project is dubbed "Bellarmine Centro" and calls for the addition of more than 65,000 square feet (6,000 m^{2}) of new space and approximately 39,000 square feet (3,600 m^{2}) of remodeled space in the existing building. There will be space for a new Graduate School of Management, bookstore, admissions, registrar, bursar and financial aid offices. Classrooms will be added and expanded and a new space dedicated to triple the size of the Thomas Merton Center, the official repository of Merton's manuscripts, which hosts approximately 3,000 research international scholars and visitors annually. A garden and green space will be added, including a green roof accessible to students and faculty. Bellarmine Centro is estimated to cost $38 million and will be funded entirely by private sources.

== Athletics ==
The Bellarmine athletic teams are called the Knights. The university is a member of the NCAA Division I ranks, primarily competing in the ASUN Conference for most sports since the 2020–21 academic year. The Knights previously competed in the Great Lakes Valley Conference (GLVC) of the NCAA Division II ranks from 1978–79 to 2019–20.

Bellarmine competes in 25 intercollegiate varsity sports: Men's sports include baseball, basketball, cross country, golf, lacrosse, soccer, sprint football, swimming, tennis, track & field (Note: The NCAA officially considers indoor and outdoor track & field to be two separate sports, holding its indoor championships in its winter season and outdoor championships in its spring season.) and wrestling; while women's sports include basketball, cross country, field hockey, golf, soccer, softball, swimming, tennis, track & field, volleyball; and co-ed sports include cheerleading and dance.

Bellarmine sponsors five sports that are not sponsored by the ASUN, one of which will become an ASUN sport in July 2021. The men's lacrosse team, the only NCAA Division I lacrosse team in Kentucky, is a member of the ASUN's relaunched men's lacrosse league. Bellarmine added men's wrestling to its SoCon membership when it joined the ASUN. Men's and women's swimming and diving joined the Coastal Collegiate Sports Association (CCSA) upon the Knights' arrival in the ASUN. The women's field hockey team was independent for its first Division I season in 2020–21, and became a single-sport member of the Mid-American Conference (MAC) in July 2021.

In 2011 the Knights won the NCAA Men's Division II Basketball Championship. In 2015, the Bellarmine University Dance Team won their first national title at the 2015 NDA collegiate championship. In 2019, the team won their second national title at the 2019 NDA collegiate championship. In 2012 Bellarmine announced the start of its swimming program. The university's newest sport is wrestling, added for the 2016–17 school year; Bellarmine effectively absorbed the wrestling program of St. Catharine College, an NAIA member that closed at the end of the 2015–16 school year. This returned NCAA wrestling to the state of Kentucky for the first time since the University of Kentucky dropped the sport in 1982. Bellarmine wrestling continues to compete in the SoCon after most other sports moved to the ASUN.

The Bellarmine Co-Ed Cheer Team also landed a national title in 2019, taking the "Intermediate Small Coed Division II" competition of the National Cheerleaders Association.

== Honorary societies ==
- Phi Alpha Theta (History)
- Lambda Pi Eta (Communications)
- Pi Sigma Alpha (Political Science)

== Notable people ==
=== Alumni ===
- John Young Brown III, Secretary of State of Kentucky from 1996 to 2004
- Joseph C. Burke, former president of State University of New York at Plattsburgh; former Acting Chancellor of the State University of New York
- Susan Cameron, Reynolds American CEO; former CEO at Brown & Williamson Tobacco Corporation
- Joseph P. Clayton, former president & CEO, DISH Network; former CEO and chairman of Sirius Satellite Radio, Inc.
- William J. Donahue, retired lieutenant general for the United States Air Force
- Chris Dowe (born 1991), professional basketball player in the Israeli Basketball Premier League
- Kelly Downard, Louisville Metro Council member (16th District) (2006)
- Shawn Evans, National Lacrosse League (NLL) player and 2013 NLL MVP
- Dapo Fagbenle, London-based music video director and entertainer
- Braydon Hobbs, professional basketball player
- Jeremy Kendle, professional basketball player
- John Lansing, President and CEO of NPR
- Quentin Letts, journalist
- John MacLeod, veteran NBA coach
- Chuck Marohnic, jazz pianist and former director of jazz studies at Arizona State University
- Bishop William Medley, Bishop of Owensboro, Kentucky
- Brandon Pfaadt, Major League Baseball player
- Frank L. Schmidt, psychologist
- Kyle Sorensen, National Lacrosse League player
- Bruce Tinsley, syndicated cartoonist and creator of the Mallard Fillmore comic
- Dillon James Ward, professional lacrosse player
- Todd Wellemeyer, Major League Baseball player

=== Faculty ===
- Jerry Abramson, Former Executive-in-residence, former Mayor of Louisville Metro, former Lieutenant Governor of Kentucky, and former White House Director of Intergovernmental Affairs

== Radio station ==
Bellarmine University has a radio station named Bellarmine Radio, catering mainly to the campus community. Initially, the radio station broadcast via a radio frequency, but, in 2005, it began to broadcast as an online radio station. Bellarmine Radio provides daily announcements about events on campus, extended coverage of Bellarmine athletics, and a variety of specialty shows.

== See also ==
- Spalding University
- Religion in Louisville, Kentucky
