= Mary Immaculate Seminary =

Catholic seminary in Northampton, Pennsylvania, U.S.

Coordinates: 40.7355°N 75.5223°W

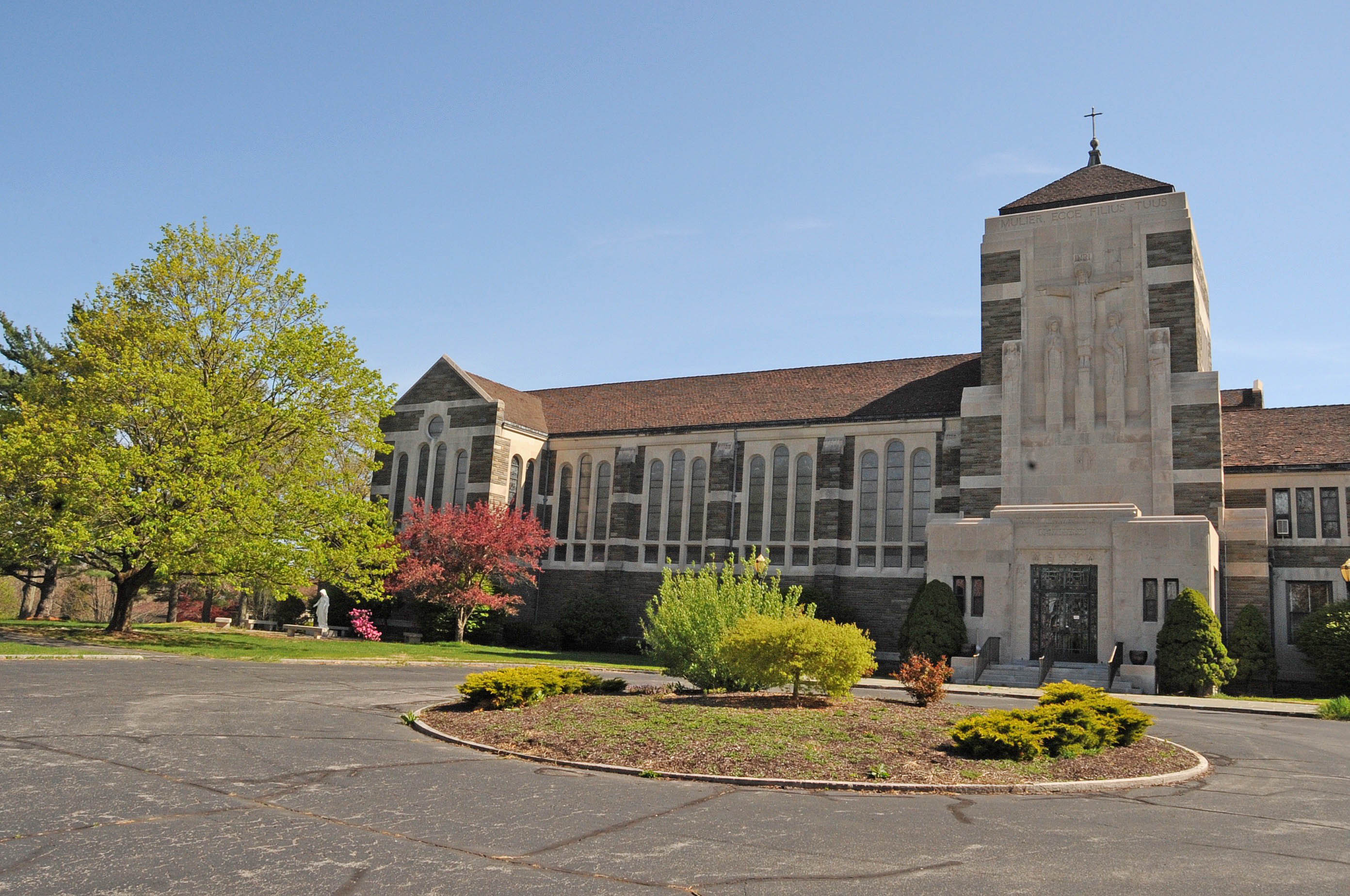
Mary Immaculate Seminary in Northampton, Pennsylvania

Mary Immaculate Seminary was a Catholic seminary in Northampton, Pennsylvania. It opened in 1939 to train seminarians in the Congregation of the Mission and operated until 1990. The facilities then served as a retreat center. The property was listed on the National Register of Historic Places in 2022.

== History ==
In 1912, the Vincentians made the decision to build a school of theology for candidates to their community based in the Germantown neighborhood of Philadelphia, Pennsylvania. The Prefect of the Vincentian minor seminary, the Rev. Joseph A. Skelly, C.M., was asked to dedicate his time to raising funds for the building of a new seminary. As a result of his labors, in 1936 the Congregation acquired a 460-acre tract of grassy fields and wooded land, at the highest point in Lehigh Township, near the palisades of the Lehigh River, about 12 miles north of Allentown within the Diocese of Allentown.

Construction began in 1938 and the cornerstone was blessed that year in a ceremony presided over by Cardinal Dennis Joseph Dougherty, the Archbishop of Philadelphia. The service was attended by 15,000 people.

The seminary held its first classes in the fall of 1939. The member of the first class were ordained after graduating the following spring. The seminary continued to serve the Eastern Province of the Congregation until 1969. By that time, the number of candidates to the Vincentian Fathers had dropped to such a point that the seminary was opened to students for dioceses of the region and other religious institutes. The last class graduated in 1990, the 50th class to have done so. The seminary had trained some 500 men for the priesthood by that time.

The Roman Catholic Archdiocese of Philadelphia began to make use of the facilities for its own seminarians. In 1996 the Vincentian Fathers sold the property to the Archdiocese, which they converted into use as a retreat center.

== The buildings ==
=== Chapel ===
In 1954 the Chapel of Mary Queen of all Saints was opened for worship by the Vincentian community.

The chapel was built in the form of a cross composed of the nave and the transept, with a semi-circular apse around the altar. The Vincentian Fathers and seminarians sat in choir stalls of white oak, with stone work of white Indiana limestone, ornamented in places with carved inscriptions. It contains a shrine to Our Lady of the Miraculous Medal. The stone work in the shrine is of Kentucky sandstone.

The architectural style of the chapel is a fusion and adaptation of ancient forms. The exterior was done in the Romanesque style, and the interior uses the Roman barrel vault for the nave. The dome of the apse, directly above the main altar, was done in a Byzantine style. The apse dome features a tile mosaic executed by Hildreth Meiere in the Art Deco style depicting Our Lady surrounded by six saints who were known for a strong devotion to her. They are:

- St. Francis of Assisi, founder of the Franciscans
- St. Dominic, O.P., holding a book
- St. Alphonsus Maria de Liguori, founder of the Redemptorists, with a monstrance
- St. Bernard of Clairvaux, O.Cist, monk and spiritual writer
- St. Simon Stock, O.Carm, initiator of the scapular devotion
- St. Gabriel of Our Lady of Sorrows, C.P.

The tabernacle is not marble, as is commonly used, but made of white onyx. The crucifix has the body of Jesus in ivory-colored linden wood, which stands out from the darker tones of the zebrawood cross, with its edging and trim done in sheet copper.

=== Tower ===
The complex includes a tower that dominates the front of the main building and which features the crucifixion. In its foyer, mosaics depict the life and works of St. Vincent de Paul, founder of the Vincentians, and notable members of the Congregation. Sayings of Vincent de Paul are sculpted into the stone.
