= Niagara University =

Catholic university in Lewiston, New York, US

- Former names: Our Lady of Angels Seminary (1856–1857); The College and Seminary of Our Lady of Angels (1857–1883)
- Motto: Ut Omnes Te Cognoscant
- Motto in English: That All May Know You
- Type: Private university
- Established: November 21, 1856; 169 years ago
- Affiliations: ACCU; NAICU
- Religious affiliation: Roman Catholic (Vincentians)
- Endowment: $111.005 million (2022)
- President: James J. Maher
- Students: 4,033 (fall 2024)
- Undergraduates: 2,692 (fall 2024)
- Postgraduates: 1,341 (fall 2024)
- Location: Lewiston, New York, U.S. 43.138°N 79.037°W
- Campus: Suburban
- Colors: Purple and white
- Nickname: Purple Eagles
- Sporting affiliations: NCAA Division I – Metro Conference; Atlantic Hockey America (men's ice hockey)
- Mascot: Monte
- Website: www.niagara.edu

Niagara University (NU) is a private Catholic university in Lewiston, New York, United States. Based in the Vincentian tradition, it is run by the Congregation of the Mission and enrolls approximately 3,700 students. Approximately half of the student body lives on campus, while the other half commute from the surrounding area. The campus area was listed as a census-designated place in 2020, with a population of 940.

== History ==
Founded by the Congregation of the Mission on 21 November 1856 as Our Lady of Angels Seminary, the school moved from Buffalo to its current location on May 1, 1857. After 26 years on its new campus as The College and Seminary of Our Lady of Angels, it changed its name to Niagara University on August 7, 1883. In 1887, the university opened a law school in Buffalo, what is now the University at Buffalo Law School after being acquired by the University at Buffalo in 1891.

The university is still run by the Vincentian Fathers. All of Niagara's 26 presidents, including its current president, Rev. James J. Maher, CM, have been Vincentian priests.

== Academics ==
=== Admissions ===
For 2023, Niagara University had an acceptance rate of 90%. The university requires an official high school transcript, evidence of past performance and character, and recommendations from teachers, counselors, or organizational leaders, but does not require applicants to submit either SAT or ACT scores. Half the applicants admitted to the university who submitted test scores had an SAT score between 1030 and 1240 or an ACT score between 24 and 28. The average high school GPA for admitted students was 3.63.

=== Areas of study and programs ===
Undergraduate students are able to choose an area of study in any of Niagara's five academic colleges. In addition to the College of Arts and Sciences, Holzschuh College of Business Administration, College of Education, College of Nursing, and the College of Hospitality and Tourism Management, Niagara's Academic Exploration Program allows first and second-year students to take courses in various departments before deciding on a major. Niagara University offers over 80 different major choices.

The university also offers academic programs in Canada which operate under the written consent of the Ministry of Colleges, Universities, Research Excellence, and Security of Ontario. The Niagara University in Ontario, located at Expo City in Vaughan, offers a bachelor's degree in Professional Studies in Education program (accredited by the Ontario College of Teachers) and a Master of Science degree in education. In 2019, Niagara University expanded their degree offerings with a Master of Business Administration (MBA), a Master of Science in finance (MSF), and a Master of Science in Information and Security and Digital Forensics (MSISDF). The two Masters programs are now being jointly offered with Seneca Polytechnic. The university also offers Ontario-based Additional Qualifications for the teacher profession.

=== College of Arts and Sciences ===
The College of Arts and Sciences forms the foundation of Niagara University's curriculum and serves as the basis for its designation as a liberal arts college. All Niagara students complete a portion of their coursework in the College of Arts and Sciences, as numerous general education courses are housed within this unit.

In 2008, Niagara University announced that a $10 million gift, the largest gift in the university's history, had been made to the College of Arts and Sciences by B. Thomas Golisano, the CEO of Paychex and the former owner of the Buffalo Sabres. The gift funded the construction of the B. Thomas Golisano Center for Integrated Sciences.

=== Holzschuh College of Business Administration ===
The business college includes programs in accounting, economics, finance, management, and marketing. The College of Business is accredited by AACSB International and has maintained accreditation since 2001. The college received a $10 million donation from Jeff and Mary Helen Holzschuh, both graduates of the university. Mr. Holzschuh is a managing director of Morgan Stanley and Mrs. Holzschuh a B.S. in nursing. The university renamed the College of Business to the Holzschuh College of Business Administration in 2022.

=== Rankings ===
In 2024, out of 178 ranked universities, Niagara University was ranked tied for 30th overall by U.S. News & World Report in Regional Universities North, ranked #2 in Best Value Schools, and ranked 13th in Best Colleges for Veterans. Taking into account educational quality, affordability, and alumni success, Money Magazine ranked Niagara University as the best college or university in the Buffalo-Niagara region in 2017 when it comes to delivering the most value for a student's educational dollar. Kiplinger's Personal Finance ranked Niagara University 82nd in the magazine's list of the 100 best values among private universities.

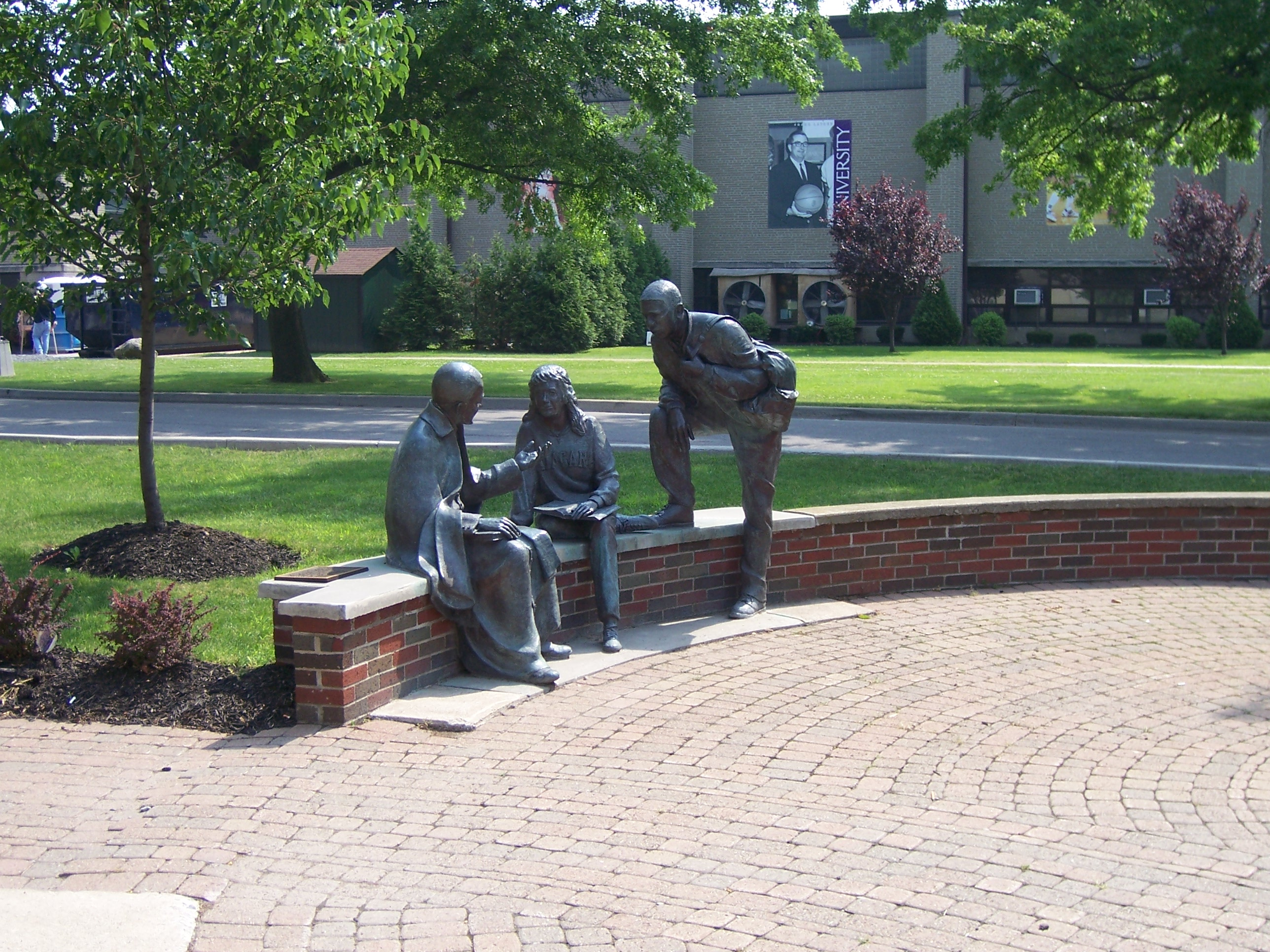
A statue of St. Vincent de Paul talking to students.

== Campus activities ==
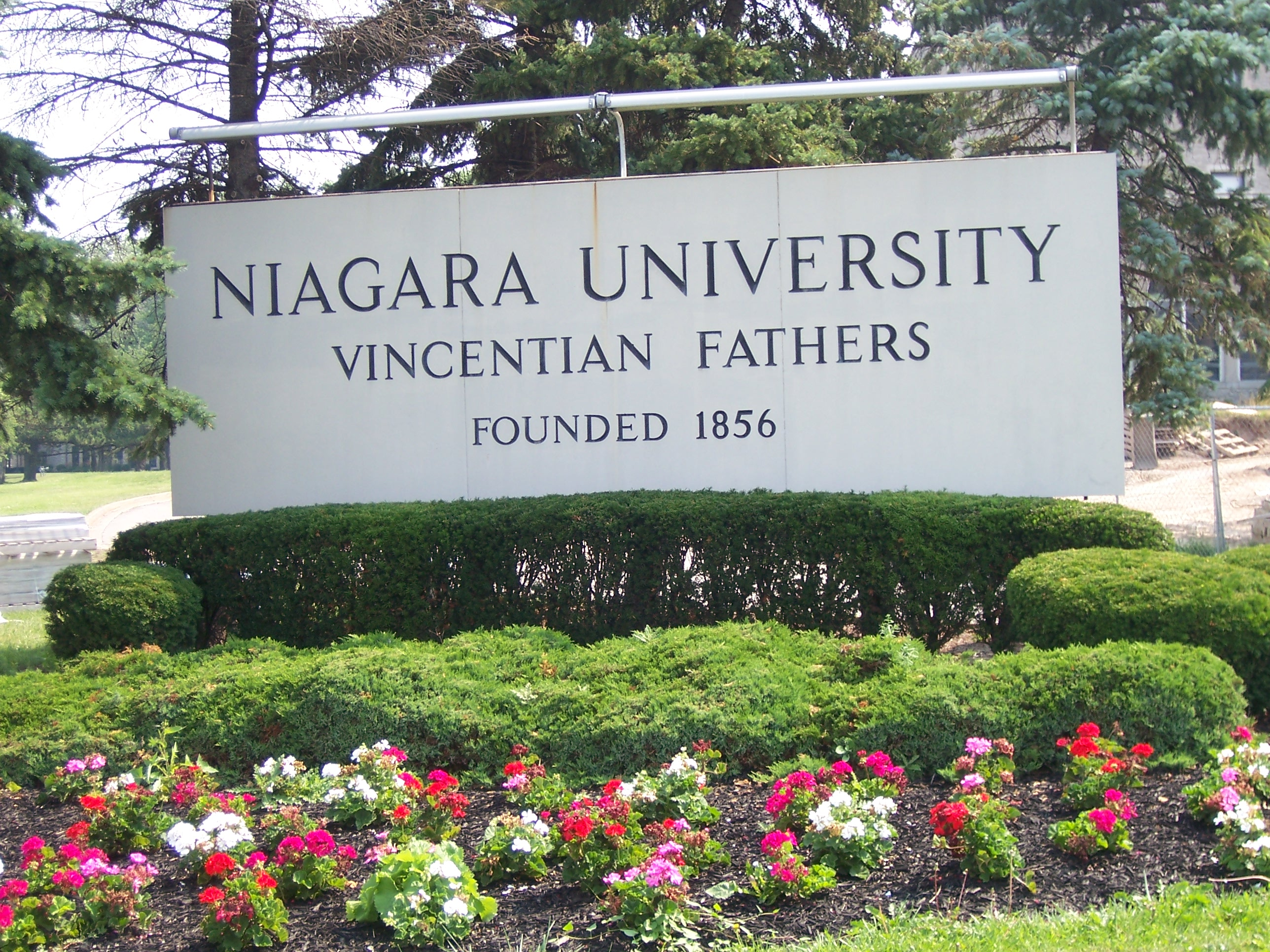

The Campus Activities Office, along with the Niagara University Student Government Association, sponsors numerous opportunities to get involved in campus life, including concerts, comedians, and weekly late-night events.

== Castellani Art Museum ==
The Castellani Art Museum of Niagara University is centrally located on the main campus and is Niagara County's only collecting museum. The museum features exhibitions of contemporary artists and traditional folk arts. The museum owns a permanent collection of over 5,700 artworks, most of which are from the 19th-century, modern and contemporary art movements.

== Athletics ==
The Niagara University Athletics Department sponsors 19 Division I sports. The Purple Eagles compete in the Metro Atlantic Athletic Conference (MAAC) in all sports except ice hockey. The men's ice hockey team competes in Atlantic Hockey America. Niagara named Simon B. Gray as its athletics director on May 16, 2014.

The men's basketball team won the MAAC Championship in 2005 and in 2007, earning automatic bids to the 2005 and 2007's NCAA tournaments, known colloquially as the "Big Dance". Niagara's first appearance in the Dance came in 1970, when All-American Calvin Murphy led the Purple Eagles to the Sweet Sixteen. On March 13, 2007, Niagara defeated Florida A&M 77–69 in the Opening Round before losing in the First Round. NU was crowned the 2012–2013 MAAC regular season champions. This title earned them an automatic bid into the NIT where they lost to the University of Maryland in the first round.

The men's hockey team won the College Hockey America Championship in 2000, 2004 and 2008, appearing in the NCAA Men's Ice Hockey Championship those years. In 2000, the "Purps" pulled an upset against University of New Hampshire to advance to the Elite Eight.

Six other Niagara teams have advanced to the NCAA Tournament in their respective sports: softball (1998); women's soccer (2006); women's tennis (2003 & 2005); men's soccer (2012); women's volleyball (2009, 2010 & 2011); and women's lacrosse (2024).

=== Clubs ===
During the 2019–2020 School Year, NU teams competed in Men's Baseball, Basketball, Ice Hockey, Lacrosse, Rugby, Soccer and Volleyball at the club level. Women teams competed in Basketball, Lacrosse, Rugby, Soccer, Softball, and Volleyball while Co-Ed teams competed in E-Sports, Field Hockey and Golf. Badminton, Roller Hockey, Running, and Tennis clubs have also been active on campus in prior years.

=== Intramurals ===
The Athletics Department also operates the Kiernan Center – Niagara's on-campus fitness facility – and sponsors a comprehensive slate of intramural sports, including basketball, broomball, flag football, indoor soccer, softball, street hockey, and rugby union.

== Notable alumni ==
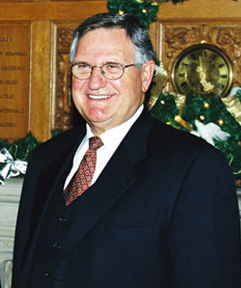
Gilbert Parent,
Speaker of the House of Commons of Canada

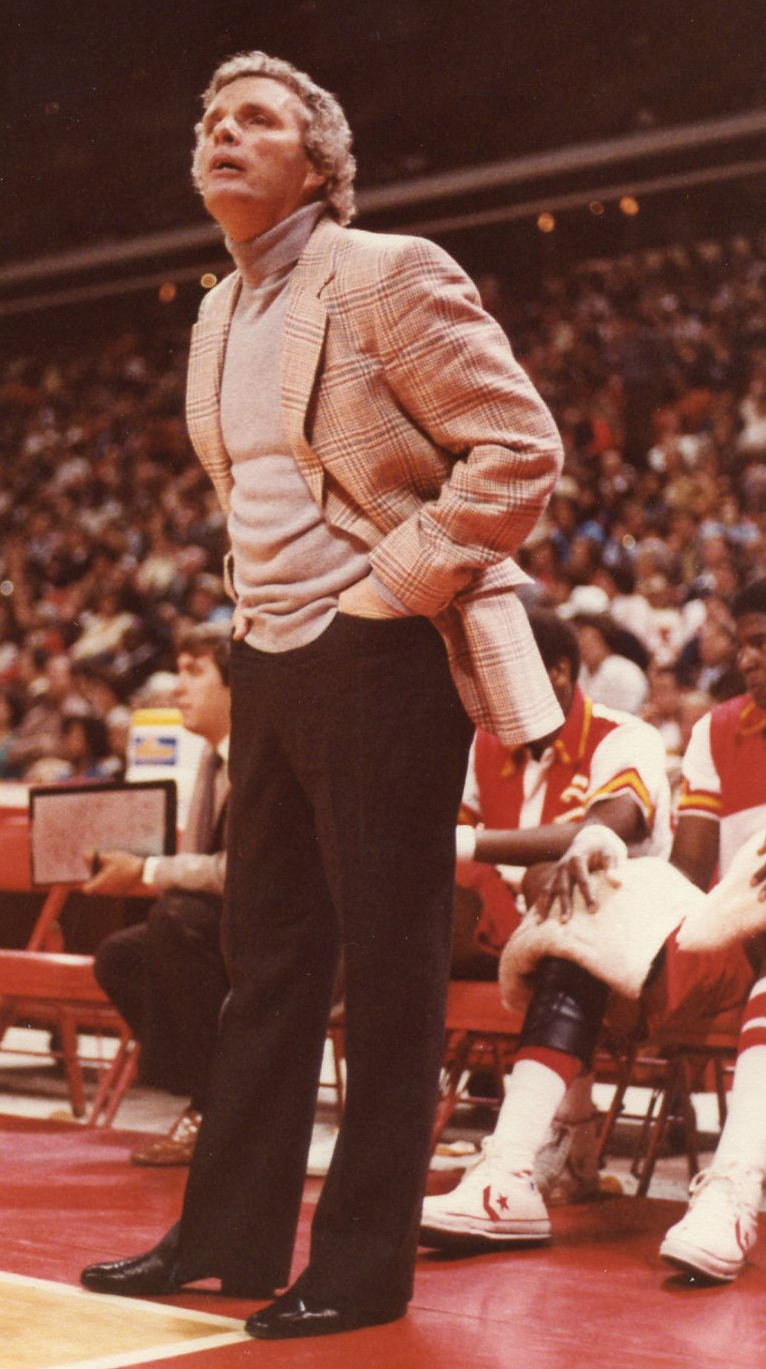
Hubie Brown,
Basketball Hall of Fame Member

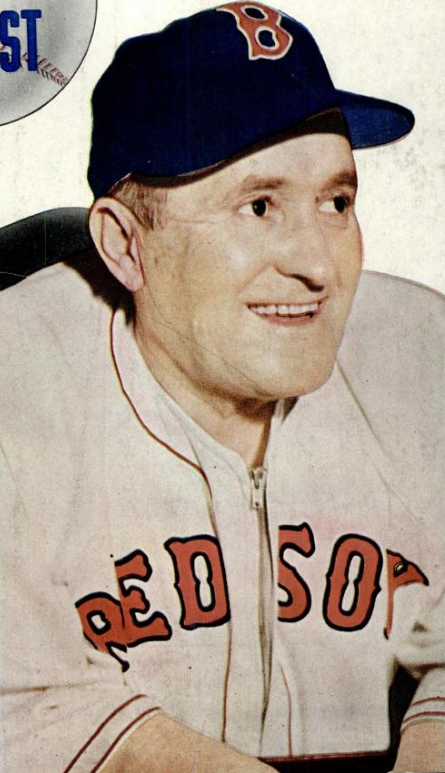
Joe McCarthy,
National Baseball Hall of Fame and Museum Member

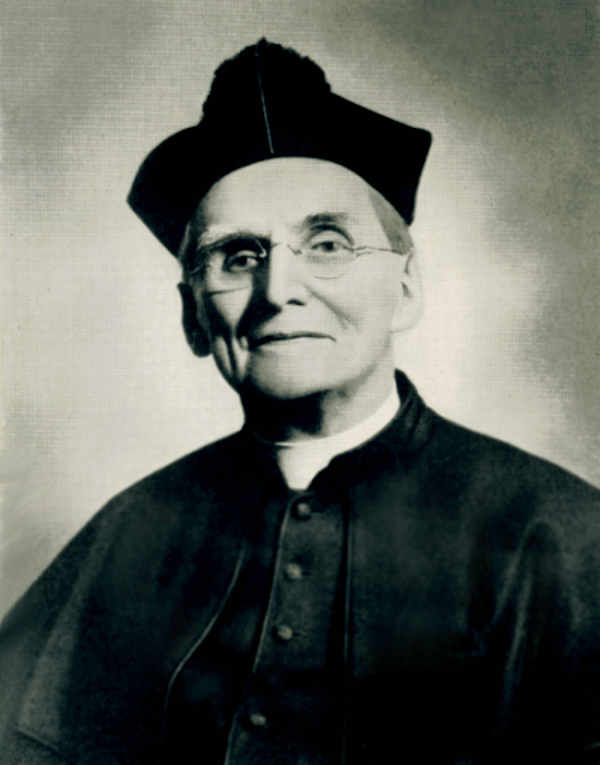
Venerable Nelson Baker,
Founder of the "City of Charity" in Lackawanna, New York

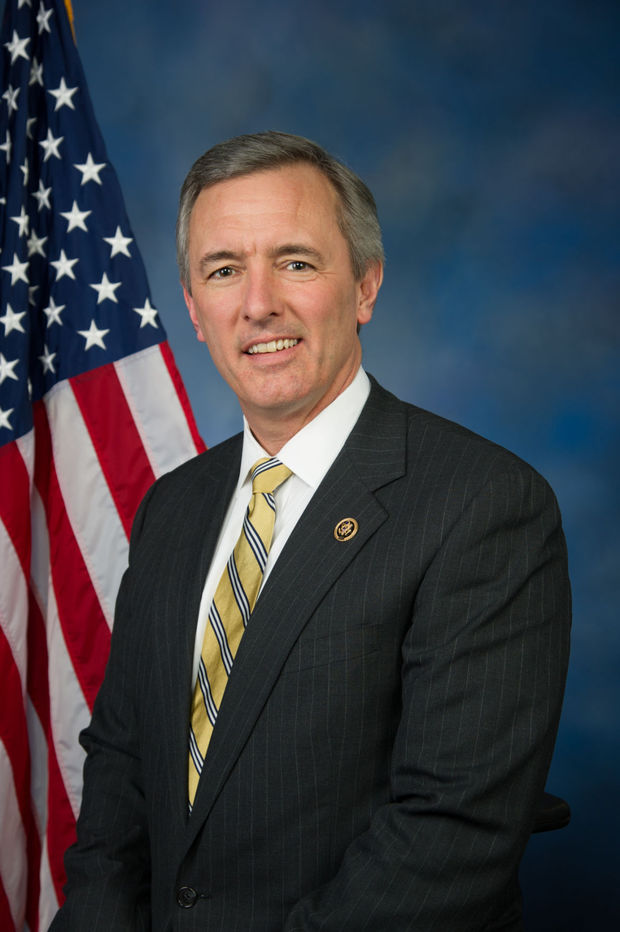
John Katko, U.S. Representative for the 24th district of New York (Syracuse Area)
