= Fordham–St. John's rivalry =

American college sports rivalry

- Fordham Rams St. John's Red Storm
- Sport: Multi-sport
- First meeting: 1909; 117 years ago (men's basketball); St. John's 21, Fordham 13
- Latest meeting: 2024 (men's basketball); St. John's 92, Fordham 60

Locations of Fordham and St. John's

The Fordham–St. John's rivalry is an inter-conference rivalry between the Fordham Rams and the St. John's Red Storm who are both located in New York City: Fordham playing in The Bronx and St. John's playing in Queens. Conference-wise, the Rams play in the Atlantic 10 Conference (Patriot League for football), while the Red Storm play in the Big East Conference.

The rivalry is most prevalent in men's basketball, where the sides have met 91 times over the last century. The Red Storm have been dominant over that time, boasting a 72–19 record over the Rams. Included, a 23-game winning streak which lasted from 1972 through 1991, although Fordham has managed a few upsets since. St. John's also dominates Fordham in women's basketball, boasting a 19–5 record overall although Fordham has split the last 6 contests. In other sports, the two teams generally meet less frequently, but there's still a buzz amongst students for such showdowns. Fordham had an advantage over St. John's in football, winning nearly two-thirds (9–6 record) of the head-to-head matches although the bulk of those affairs came with little pageantry as most came when the two schools were fielding D-III teams. The teams haven't played since 1988 and the series will remain dormant since St. John's disbanded its football team in 2002, thus allowing St. John's to spend more resources on basketball while Fordham continues to support a D-1 football program. Fordham's football rivalry is now with its Jesuit sister schools Georgetown and College of the Holy Cross, all three playing in the Patriot League. The Bleacher Report states the major rival to St. John's in the Big East is Seton Hall. Georgetown is also a rival.

To a certain extent a contention between the schools goes beyond sports. As the two largest Catholic universities in the region, containing the two largest green campuses in New York City, the institutions can be considered similar in look.

The friendly friction is said to have started in the 19th century when both schools were known as St. John's College. Fordham was founded as the third oldest university in New York City by coadjutor bishop (later archbishop) of the Diocese of New York, John Hughes and named after Saint John the Baptist in 1841 as a seminary that was run by diocesan clerics. When Hughes wished to expand and open a men's college, the clerics did not wish to pursue that avenue for the Provincial who saw having the seminarians teaching in the college as a distraction to the young men studying for the priesthood. Wishing to staff the seminary and a college, Hughes removed the Vincentian priests and invited the Jesuits to open the men's college. The school, located in the Fordham section of The Bronx was deeded over to the Jesuits in 1847. In 1868, in the Bedford-Stuyvesant section of Brooklyn, Brooklyn Bishop John Loughlin invited the Vincentian Fathers to found a separate seminary for the young Brooklyn Diocese as well as St. John's College, both named after Saint John the Baptist. The Vincentians accepted. In 1907 the Jesuit school was charted to be a university and the St. John's College name was dropped to use the town where it was located in the name, a practice common to Jesuit schools. Thus the Vincentian school (chartered as a full university in 1933) became the area's only "St. John's." The university moved to the Hillcrest section of Queens in 1956. Although the university is run by the Vincentians, a Dominican priest, Brian Shanley became the President in 2021. Fordham, although run by the Jesuits since 1841, now has a lay president Tania Tetlow starting in 2022.

== History ==
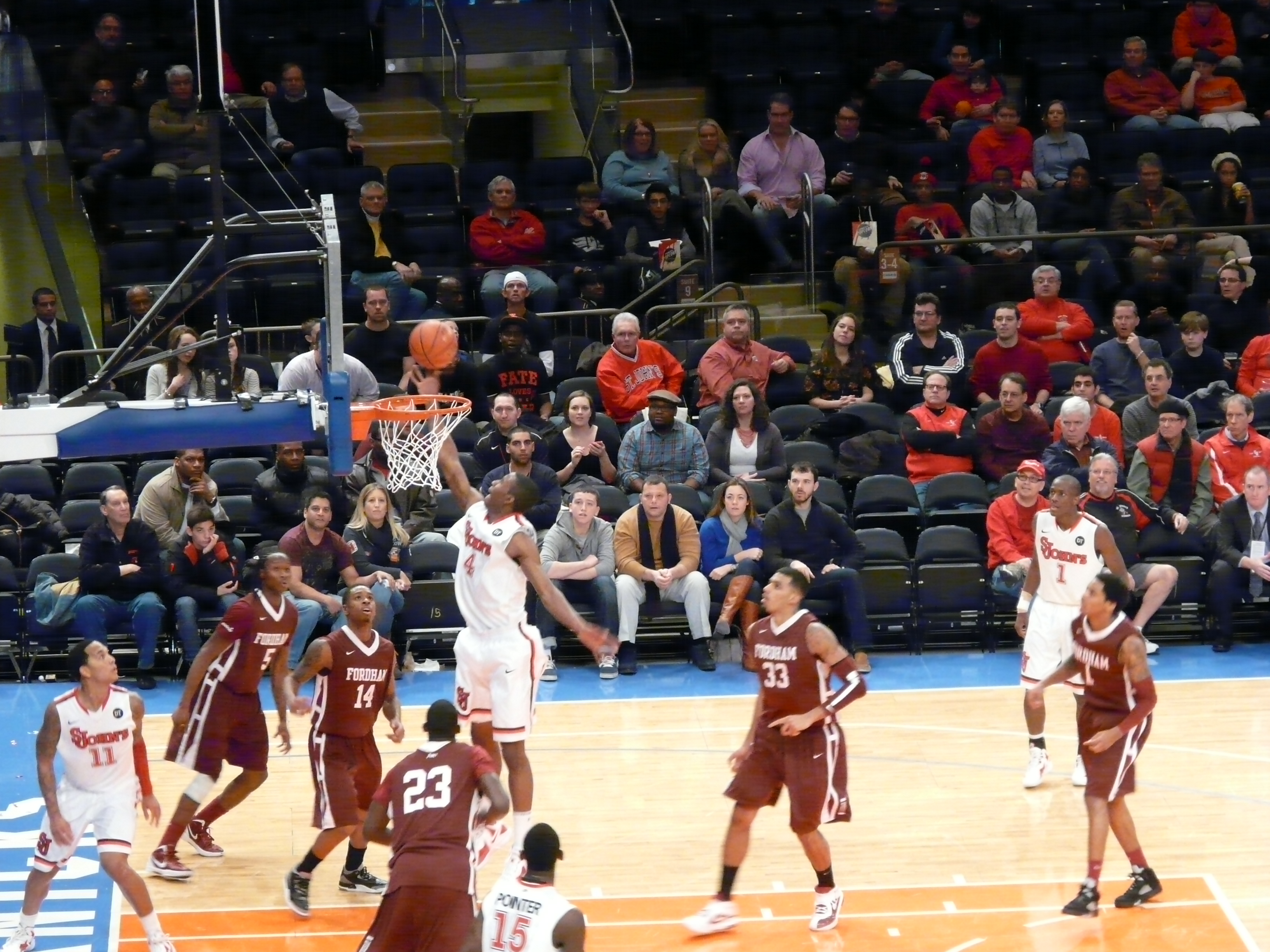
A basketball game between Fordham and St. John's in 2011.

Up until the CCNY point-shaving scandal, New York City was home to seven (St. John's, NYU, LIU, CCNY, Columbia, Fordham, Manhattan) major basketball programs. That transgression, referred to as "The City Dump Scandal" as well as an even bigger disgrace a decade later, simply known as the 1961 point-shaving scandal, greatly diminished New York City's standing as the epicenter of college hoops. Added to that, NYU's financial woes which had it scrap its basketball program after the 1971 season.

By the early 1980s only St. John's remained on the national stage as each of the other six schools had already transitioned to smaller D-I status or were relegated into the D-III ranks. Fordham, having qualified into 8 NIT and 1 NCAA tournament during the 1980s and early '90s, was the strongest of the six and the only to meet St. John's regularly throughout the 20th century. In fact the Rams met the Red Storm into the early 2000s until a brief hiatus following the 2003 season. The series resumed in 2009 and became heated when in 2013, St. John's sophomore, Chris Obekpa, made headlines for remarks on Fordham. He described Fordham is a place for New York City basketball players to go that are not accepted by St. John's. Obekpa said he played with several of the Fordham players in high school and that "they are mad that they are not here. Playing us is their opportunity to prove a point". The next day, St. John's would go on to defeat Fordham 104–58, making it the most lopsided result in the series history. Fordham draws some solace in that it has always ranked higher academically (in 2022 U.S. News & World Report ranked Fordham at 66th, St.John's at 172nd) and its football team won more games; continuing its football program while St. John's discontinued theirs. As such the rivalry is centered on basketball.

St. John's won in another blowout the following year but when Fordham turned the tables in 2015, drama spewed between the two men's basketball coaches. St. John's reaffirmed its position as top team with a 28-point win in 2016. The sides haven't met on the court since but the rivalry continues in smaller non-revenue sports, particularly softball where the schools have consistently battled since the 2009 season.

== College comparison ==
Category	Fordham	St. John's
Type	Private	Private
Affiliation	Catholic (Jesuit)	Catholic (Vincentian)
Location	The Bronx	Queens
Students	15,582	21,087
Endowment	$1.1 billion (2021)	$719.7 million (2020)
School Colors	Maroon & White	Red, White, & Blue
Nickname	Rams	Red Storm
Basketball Arena	Rose Hill Gymnasium	Carnesecca Arena
Baseball Diamond	Houlihan Park	Jack Kaiser Stadium
Soccer Field	Jack Coffey Field	Belson Stadium
Softball Field	Bahoshy Field	Red Storm Field

== All-time results ==
=== Summary ===
Sport	All-time series record	Last result	Next meeting
Baseball	St. John's leads 56–25	St. John's won 8–2 on March 25, 2024	TBD
Men's Basketball	St. John's leads 71–19	St. John's won 92–60 on November 4, 2024	TBD
Women's Basketball	St. John's leads 19–6	Fordham won 67–64 (OT) on December 12, 2017	TBD
Football	Fordham leads 9–6–1	Fordham won 46–15 on October 30, 1988	—N/a
Men's Soccer	St. John's leads 9–8–1	St. John's won 1–0 on September 6, 2021	TBD
Women's Soccer	St. John's leads 9–2–4	St. John's won 5–0 on August 25, 2013	TBD
Softball	St. John's leads 17–12	Fordham won 4–1 on March 26, 2025	March 18, 2026

Series led and games won by Fordham are shaded ██ maroon. Series led and games won by St. John's shaded ██ red.

=== Baseball ===
Fordham victories	St. John's victories

No.	Date	Location	Winner	Score
1	1937	New York	Fordham	5–2
2	1939	New York	St. John's	6–3
3	1940	New York	Fordham	9–6
4	1941	New York	St. John's	4–1
5	1941	New York	St. John's	5–1
6	1942	New York	Fordham	7–5
7	1942	New York	Fordham	4–2
8	1943	New York	St. John's	3–0
9	1943	New York	St. John's	8–3
10	1946	New York	Fordham	2–1
11	1946	New York	St. John's	4–3
12	1947	New York	Fordham	4–3
13	1947	New York	St. John's	11–4
14	1948	New York	Fordham	4–2
15	1948	New York	St. John's	10–6
16	1949	New York	St. John's	10–9
17	1949	New York	St. John's	2–1
18	1950	New York	Fordham	8–5
19	1951	New York	Fordham	2–1
20	1952	New York	Fordham	4–1
21	1953	New York	Fordham	6–3
22	1955	New York	Fordham	4–0
23	May 14, 1956	Queens, NY	St. John's	3–2
24	May 2, 1957	The Bronx, NY	St. John's	3–2
25	April 15, 1958	The Bronx, NY	Fordham	7–5
26	May 19, 1959	The Bronx, NY	Fordham	7–4
27	April 12, 1960	The Bronx, NY	St. John's	4–3
28	May 7, 1960	Queens, NY	St. John's	6–5
29	April 8, 1961	Queens, NY	St. John's	11–2
30	May 5, 1961	The Bronx, NY	St. John's	9–6
31	April 28, 1962	Queens, NY	St. John's	3–2
32	April 28, 1962	Queens, NY	St. John's	5–2
33	May 4, 1963	The Bronx, NY	St. John's	6–5
34	May 4, 1963	The Bronx, NY	St. John's	5–3
35	May 1964	Queens, NY	St. John's	2–1
36	May 11, 1964	The Bronx, NY	St. John's	10–7
37	April 14, 1965	The Bronx, NY	Fordham	6–5
38	April 21, 1966	Queens, NY	St. John's	2–0
39	April 4, 1967	The Bronx, NY W	St. John's	11–5
40	April 10, 1968	Queens, NY	St. John's	1–0
41	May 3, 1969	The Bronx, NY	St. John's	4–2

No.	Date	Location	Winner	Score
42	April 6, 1970	Queens, NY	St. John's	8–1
43	April 8, 1971	The Bronx, NY	St. John's	10–8
44	May 7, 1972	Queens, NY	St. John's	5–0
45	May 7, 1972	Queens, NY	St. John's	2–1
46	May 13, 1973	The Bronx, NY	Fordham	7–4
47	April 9, 1975	The Bronx, NY	St. John's	6–4
48	April 7, 1976	Queens, NY	St. John's	5–1
49	May 12, 1977	The Bronx, NY	St. John's	6–5
50	May 4, 1978	Queens, NY	Fordham	3–1
51	April 6, 1979	Queens, NY	Fordham	5–4
52	April 2, 1980	The Bronx, NY	St. John's	15–3
53	April 2, 1981	Queens, NY	St. John's	16–7
54	May 7, 1981	The Bronx, NY	St. John's	12–2
55	April 2, 1982	The Bronx, NY	St. John's	13–7
56	April 29, 1982	The Bronx, NY	Fordham	9–1
57	April 28, 1983	The Bronx, NY	Fordham	13–12
58	March 29, 1983	Queens, NY	St. John's	4–2
59	April 2, 1984	Queens, NY	St. John's	4–2
60	April 26, 1984	Queens, NY	St. John's	16–6
61	April 10, 1985	Queens, NY	St. John's	3–2
62	April 25, 1985	The Bronx, NY	St. John's	13–6
63	April 24, 1986	Queens, NY	St. John's	14–7
64	April 30, 1987	The Bronx, NY	St. John's	11–6
65	April 27, 1989	The Bronx, NY	St. John's	7–1
66	April 26, 1990	Queens, NY	St. John's	5–4
67	March 19, 1997	The Bronx, NY	Fordham	12–10
68	March 10, 1998	Queens, NY	Fordham	10–6
69	May 6, 1999	The Bronx, NY	St. John's	7–1
70	April 13, 2000	Queens, NY	St. John's	11–0
71	April 19, 2001	Queens, NY	St. John's	12–8
72	April 18, 2002	The Bronx, NY	St. John's	12–7
73	April 22, 2009	The Bronx, NY	St. John's	8–1
74	April 21, 2010	Queens, NY	St. John's	12–5
75	March 19, 2021	Queens, NY	St. John's	4–1
76	March 20, 2021	The Bronx, NY	Fordham	7–6
77	March 20, 2021	The Bronx, NY	St. John's	4–3
78	March 21, 2021	Queens, NY	Fordham	7–6
79	March 22, 2024	Queens, NY	St. John's	9–0
80	March 24, 2024	The Bronx, NY	Fordham	2–1
81	March 25, 2024	Queens, NY	St. John's	8–2
Series: St. John's leads 56–25

=== Basketball ===
==== Men's basketball ====
Fordham victories	St. John's victories

No.	Date	Location	Winner	Score
1	January 30, 1909	Queens, NY	St. John's	21–13
2	January 11, 1912	Queens, NY	St. John's	48–19
3	January 29, 1913	Queens, NY	St. John's	38–30
4	January 16, 1920	Queens, NY	Fordham	51–34
5	January 24, 1920	The Bronx, NY	Fordham	34–30
6	January 17, 1921	Queens, NY	St. John's	42–33
7	January 12, 1922	Queens, NY	St. John's	32–31
8	January 28, 1922	The Bronx, NY	St. John's	27–18
9	January 17, 1923	The Bronx, NY	St. John's	40–21
10	January 30, 1926	The Bronx, NY	Fordham	28–16
11	January 29, 1927	The Bronx, NY	Fordham	33–20
12	January 6, 1928	The Bronx, NY	Fordham	32–20
13	February 20, 1929	The Bronx, NY	Fordham	24–21
14	February 22, 1933	Manhattan, NY	St. John's	35–20
15	January 12, 1938	The Bronx, NY	St. John's	46–33
16	January 18, 1939	The Bronx, NY	St. John's	42–31
17	January 17, 1940	The Bronx, NY	Fordham	23–22
18	January 18, 1941	The Bronx, NY	St. John's	51–46
19	January 14, 1942	Manhattan, NY	St. John's	54–44
20	January 13, 1943	Manhattan, NY	St. John's	63–47
21	March 17, 1943	Manhattan, NY	St. John's	69–43
22	January 31, 1945	Queens, NY	St. John's	71–35
23	February 16, 1946	The Bronx, NY	St. John's	49–29
24	February 12, 1947	Queens, NY	St. John's	60–36
25	February 12, 1948	Manhattan, NY	Fordham	51–44
26	February 18, 1949	Manhattan, NY	St. John's	67–48
27	February 17, 1950	Manhattan, NY	Fordham	70–64
28	February 28, 1951	Manhattan, NY	#9 St. John's	73–63
29	January 30, 1952	Manhattan, NY	#15 St. John's	69–56
30	January 29, 1953	Manhattan, NY	St. John's	62–56
31	February 8, 1955	The Bronx, NY	St. John's	64–56
32	December 28, 1955	Manhattan, NY	St. John's	97–85
33	February 25, 1956	Manhattan, NY	Fordham	82–59
34	December 29, 1956	Manhattan, NY	St. John's	75–72
35	February 23, 1957	The Bronx, NY	Fordham	83–77
36	February 22, 1958	Manhattan, NY	St. John's	82–74
37	February 14, 1959	The Bronx, NY	Fordham	79–77
38	February 13, 1960	Manhattan, NY	St. John's	83–64
39	February 25, 1961	The Bronx, NY	St. John's	80–66
40	February 24, 1962	Queens, NY	St. John's	76–60
41	February 23, 1963	The Bronx, NY	Fordham	57–42
42	February 22, 1964	Queens, NY	St. John's	59–46
43	February 20, 1965	The Bronx, NY	Fordham	60–46
44	February 19, 1966	Queens, NY	St. John's	74–72
45	February 18, 1967	The Bronx, NY	St. John's	54–52
46	February 17, 1968	Queens, NY	St. John's	75–71

No.	Date	Location	Winner	Score
47	February 15, 1969	Manhattan, NY	#9 St. John's	51–46
48	February 14, 1970	Queens, NY	St. John's	80–53
49	February 13, 1971	Manhattan, NY	#20 Fordham	76–72
50	February 12, 1972	Queens, NY	St. John's	78–60
51	February 10, 1973	Manhattan, NY	#14 St. John's	98–73
52	February 9, 1974	Manhattan, NY	St. John's	65–59
53	February 8, 1975	Manhattan, NY	St. John's	56–46
54	February 7, 1976	Manhattan, NY	#12 St. John's	77–67
55	February 12, 1977	The Bronx, NY	St. John's	83–63
56	January 11, 1978	Queens, NY	St. John's	97–56
57	February 10, 1979	The Bronx, NY	St. John's	66–48
58	February 9, 1980	Queens, NY	#8 St. John's	78–60
59	January 31, 1981	The Bronx, NY	St. John's	80–69
60	November 28, 1981	Jamaica, NY	St. John's	91–71
61	December 19, 1981	Queens, NY	St. John's	72–59
62	December 15, 1982	The Bronx, NY	#9 St. John's	74–66
63	December 27, 1983	Manhattan, NY	#8 St. John's	56–52
64	December 5, 1984	Queens, NY	#3 St. John's	47–46
65	January 22, 1986	Manhattan, NY	#8 St. John's	56–47
66	December 2, 1986	Queens, NY	St. John's	80–61
67	December 9, 1987	The Bronx, NY	St. John's	76–71
68	December 7, 1988	Queens, NY	St. John's	67–47
69	December 27, 1988	Manhattan, NY	St. John's	84–59
70	December 12, 1989	The Bronx, NY	#18 St. John's	68–60
71	December 22, 1990	Queens, NY	#13 St. John's	74–62
72	December 27, 1991	Manhattan, NY	#18 St. John's	70–53
73	December 10, 1992	The Bronx, NY	Fordham	60–55
74	December 18, 1993	Uniondale, NY	St. John's	98–72
75	December 22, 1994	Queens, NY	St. John's	76–65
76	December 20, 1995	The Bronx, NY	St. John's	66–47
77	December 19, 1998	Queens, NY	#15 St. John's	88–57
78	December 9, 2000	Manhattan, NY	Fordham	68–67
79	December 1, 2001	Manhattan, NY	St. John's	76–67
80	December 7, 2002	Manhattan, NY	St. John's	81–58
81	December 13, 2009	Queens, NY	St. John's	73–56
82	December 11, 2010	The Bronx, NY	Fordham	84–81
83	December 17, 2011	Manhattan, NY	St. John's	56–50
84	December 8, 2012	Manhattan, NY	St. John's	58–47
85	December 7, 2013	Manhattan, NY	St. John's	104–58
86	December 14, 2014	Manhattan, NY	#24 St. John's	74–53
87	December 2, 2015	The Bronx, NY	Fordham	73–57
88	December 8, 2016	Queens, NY	St. John's	90–62
89	December 5, 2021	Queens, NY	St. John's	83–69
90	December 16, 2023	Manhattan, NY	St. John's	77–55
91	November 4, 2024	Queens, NY	St. John's	92–60
Series: St. John's leads 72–19

==== Women's basketball ====
Fordham victories	St. John's victories

No.	Date	Location	Winner	Score
1	February 4, 1975	The Bronx, NY	St. John's	51–31
2	February 20, 1976	Queens, NY	St. John's	56–50
3	February 12, 1977	The Bronx, NY	St. John's	67–58
4	March 4, 1977	Queens, NY	St. John's	66–47
5	January 11, 1978	Queens, NY	St. John's	66–54
6	February 5, 1978	Queens, NY	St. John's	54–47
7	February 10, 1979	The Bronx, NY	Fordham	65–57
8	February 9, 1980	Queens, NY	St. John's	73–71
9	February 23, 1980	Neutral	Fordham	73–60
10	January 14, 1981	The Bronx, NY	St. John's	85–57
11	December 19, 1981	Queens, NY	St. John's	89–61
12	December 15, 1982	The Bronx, NY	St. John's	80–55
13	December 27, 1983	Neutral	St. John's	103–73

No.	Date	Location	Winner	Score
14	December 21, 1985	Queens, NY	St. John's	63–45
15	February 16, 1987	The Bronx, NY	St. John's	68–48
16	December 18, 1987	Queens, NY	St. John's	73–58
17	November 29, 1988	The Bronx, NY	Fordham	88–82
18	February 12, 1990	Queens, NY	St. John's	81–70
19	December 15, 1990	The Bronx, NY	St. John's	89–70
20	November 24, 2001	Queens, NY	Fordham	62–41
21	December 7, 2002	Neutral	Fordham	53–49
22	December 4, 2004	The Bronx, NY	St. John's	64–42
23	March 22, 2015	Queens, NY	St. John's	77–63
24	December 13, 2016	The Bronx, NY	St. John's	59–45
25	December 12, 2017	Queens, NY	Fordham	67–64^{2OT}
Series: St. John's leads 19–6

=== Football ===
Fordham, originally known as St. John's College of Rose Hill, began their football program in 1882. Playing at a small school level, early opposition came from local athletic clubs, military and naval units, YMCA groups and even its own reserve team. When up against other colleges, Fordham's main rivals were Xavier (a school which later dropped its college division but still exists as a high school and to this day is a rival of Fordham Prep), CCNY, Saint Peter's and Seton Hall. The school officially changed its name to Fordham University before the 1908 season and by then they had already sprinkled in a few more established teams, like NYU, Columbia, Rutgers, Princeton, Cornell and Syracuse, to their schedule. For the most however, Fordham still played a small school schedule until the 1920s. Early in that decade they made a slight move up to what today would best be called the D-II level while mostly scheduling other elite Catholic schools like Boston College, Holy Cross, Villanova and Georgetown. By decade's end they made another and far more drastic jump into what we today call the D-I/FBS level.

From 1929 to 1942 the Rams reeled off 14 straight winning seasons while often playing in front of near capacity crowds at the 55,000 seat Polo Grounds. During that era only Alabama had a higher winning percentage in all of major level college football. National college polls began after the 1935 season where Fordham finished with a Top-20 ranking. They followed that with six straight additional Top-20 rankings from 1936 to 1941. Only Duke also finished in the Top-20 in each of those first seven years of post-season polls. Also included during Fordham's run was the formation of the famed "Seven Blocks of Granite" during the 1936 and 1937 seasons, participating in the first ever televised football game in 1939, a Cotton Bowl appearance in 1940 and a Sugar Bowl win in 1941.

Like many other schools, Fordham put their program on hiatus while the country fought WWII. Rams football returned in 1946 but on a deemphasized basis. Still in the FBS level, Fordham replaced their national schedule with a more regional one. Despite leading the country in passing in 1949, and again in 1952, and almost landing a spot into the 1950 Gator Bowl, results were mixed at best during the post-war years. Attendance declined drastically, perhaps the result of not only an inferior product on the field but also white-flight and the rise of television. After a horrific 1-7-1 season in 1954, where Fordham only drew about 12,000 per game, the program was scrapped.

The sport remained absent from campus life until 1964 when students formed a club team. Decent success at the game's lowest level, including a club football national championship in 1968, allowed the university to bring football back to varsity status for the 1970 season. There they played at what would become the D-III level where in 1987 the Rams landed a spot in the D-III playoffs. That success propelled the school to jump to the I-AA (now known as FCS) level in 1989. The promotion into the Division I subdivision proved unsuccessful for over a decade as it took until 2001 for Fordham to finish with a winning record. Since then things have changed dramatically as the Rams qualified into the 2002, 2007, 2013, 2014 and 2015 playoffs. Despite never winning an FCS national championship, Fordham has finished in the Top-20 in each of those seasons as well.

St. John's, originally known as St. John's College of Brooklyn, began their football program in 1895. Located inside two buildings within the Bedford-Stuyvesant section of Brooklyn, and lacking a green campus, St. John's staged their home games on makeshift fields at the Prospect Park Parade Grounds. Playing at the absolute smallest of levels, most competition came local athletic clubs and even local high schools. This included Fordham Prep which went 2–0 against St. John's during their early football years. Simply fielding a team itself proved somewhat difficult as St. John's spent those early years sporadically dropping and restarting their program.

Finally, in 1923 the school made a more sincere effort to build a true football program. Although continuing play at a small level, new schedules against secondary Catholic schools like Providence and Niagara were an improvement to previous ones featuring high school teams. Saint John's moved their home games to 30,000 seat Ebbet's Field and despite only averaging about 3,000 fans per game, they did schedule a few intriguing contests against more established programs like Fordham and Holy Cross. Even defeating Fordham in 1923 and playing Holy Cross close in 1925 did little to create much in public support and in 1929 St. John's moved their home games to Dexter Field, a minor league baseball park in Woodhaven, Queens. Although attendance improved to about 5,000 per game, football continued to lose money and the program was discontinued following the 1931 season.

In 1956 the entire university moved to a large, green campus in Hillcrest, Queens. Set on what had previously been a golf course, the new campus suddenly offered St. John's the space to build an authentic campus. In 1965, a year after Fordham students created a club team, St. John's students did the same. Their first game back came against Manhattan College, who coincidentally, had also served as St. John's last opponent before eliminating football in 1931. Manhattan had won that 1931 encounter, 8–7, but 34 years later, St. John's avenged that loss with a 19–8 victory. The team remained mostly successful at the club level and played for a regional championship in 1974 before finally receiving varsity status prior to the 1978 season. Playing at the D-III level, St. John's again remained mostly successful. Although they never advanced to the D-III playoffs, they did qualify into regional ECAC bowls in 1983 and again in 1989.

In 1993 the "Dayton Rule” disallowed D-I schools from playing lower-level football. Instead, these schools, including St. John's, were forced into the I-AA (now FCS) level despite not truly being able to fund I-AA programs. While these schools were able to band together and avoid competition against legitimate FCS teams, none was ever ranked or invited into the FCS playoffs during those early years. Instead, they were considered “Mid-Majors” and the best they could muster in post-season play involved regional ECAC bowls. Much like they had done as a D-III, St. John's qualified into the 1994 ECAC-IFC championship game and after previous defeats, won their first post-season game ever. Over the next decade however the "Mid-Major” ranks began disappearing as many of the former D-III schools started the slow process of building legitimate FCS programs. Others chose to instead drop the sport entirely. St. John's chose the latter and terminated their program after the 2002 season.

Fordham victories	St. John's victories

No.	Date	Location	Winner	Score
1	November 2, 1918	The Bronx, NY	Fordham	27–0
2	October 26, 1923	Manhattan, NY	St. John's	13–0
3	September 30, 1967	The Bronx, NY	Fordham	31–3
4	October 12, 1968	Queens, NY	Fordham	32–16
5	October 4, 1969	The Bronx, NY	Fordham	12–0
6	October 31, 1970	Queens, NY	Tie	21–21
7	September 30, 1971	The Bronx, NY	St. John's	24–14
8	October 21, 1972	Queens, NY	Fordham	14–7

No.	Date	Location	Winner	Score
9	September 11, 1982	Queens, NY	St. John's	14–9
10	September 10, 1983	The Bronx, NY	St. John's	28–7
11	September 29, 1984	Queens, NY	St. John's	19–18
12	September 5, 1985	The Bronx, NY	Fordham	27–26
13	October 4, 1986	Queens, NY	St. John's	38–7
14	October 3, 1987	The Bronx, NY	Fordham	34–23
15	October 30, 1988	Queens, NY	Fordham	46–15
Series: Fordham leads 8–6–1

=== Soccer ===
==== Men's soccer ====
Fordham's men's soccer program began in 1956, while St. John's program began in 1979. The Red Storm first played Fordham in 1980, as inter-conference opponents of the Tri-State Soccer Conference. In 1985, St. John's moved to the Big East Conference, while Fordham moved to the MAAC. The two teams met in the first round of the 1996 NCAA Division I Men's Soccer Tournament, where St. John's won 5-1 en route to an NCAA championship. The 2017 affair saw Fordham defeat St. John's for the first time since 1990. After a short hiatus St. John's won the rematch in 2021.

Fordham victories	St. John's victories

No.	Date	Location	Winner	Score
1	November 8, 1980	Queens, NY	Fordham	3–0
2	November 7, 1981	Queens, NY	St. John's	2–0
3	November 6, 1982	Queens, NY	Fordham	1–0
4	November 5, 1983	The Bronx, NY	Fordham	2–0
5	November 3, 1984	Queens, NY	Fordham	4–0
6	November 12, 1985	The Bronx, NY	Fordham	2–0
7	October 16, 1987	The Bronx, NY	Fordham	1–0
8	October 14, 1988	Queens, NY	St. John's	2–0
9	October 13, 1989	The Bronx, NY	St. John's	2–0
10	September 5, 1990	Queens, NY	Fordham	2–0

No.	Date	Location	Winner	Score
11	September 11, 1991	The Bronx, NY	St. John's	1–0
12	September 9, 1992	Queens, NY	St. John's	3–0
13	September 8, 1993	The Bronx, NY	Tie	1–1
14	August 31, 1996	Queens, NY	St. John's	5–3
15	November 23, 1996	Queens, NY	St. John's	5–1
16	September 30, 2014	Queens, NY	St. John's	1–0
17	September 1, 2017	Queens, NY	Fordham	1–0
18	September 6, 2021	Queens, NY	St. John's	1–0
Series: St. John's leads 9–8–1

==== Women's soccer ====
Fordham victories	St. John's victories

No.	Date	Location	Winner	Score
1	September 26, 1987	Queens, NY	St. John's	1–0
2	October 17, 1987	The Bronx, NY	Tie	3–3
3	September 6, 1994	Queens, NY	St. John's	3–0
4	September 6, 1995	The Bronx, NY	St. John's	7–0
5	September 12, 1996	Queens, NY	Tie	0–0
6	September 10, 1997	The Bronx, NY	St. John's	4–1
7	September 1, 1998	Queens, NY	Fordham	2–0
8	September 1, 1999	The Bronx, NY	Tie	2–2

No.	Date	Location	Winner	Score
9	August 29, 2000	Queens, NY	St. John's	2–1
10	September 22, 2001	The Bronx, NY	Fordham	1–0
11	September 3, 2002	Queens, NY	St. John's	5–1
12	September 3, 2010	Hempstead, NY	St. John's	1–0
13	August 26, 2011	Queens, NY	Tie	0–0
14	September 7, 2012	The Bronx, NY	St. John's	2–0
15	August 25, 2013	Queens, NY	St. John's	5–0
Series: St. John's leads 9–2–4

=== Softball ===
St. John's softball program began in 1981. The following year they won the New York State (AIAW) Championship. As a regional power they qualified into the championship round of the 1988 and 1989 ECAC Tournaments, falling on both occasions. The Big East began sponsoring softball the following year and during that inaugural season St. John's was once again a post-season finalist before again bowing out. Afterwards St. John's slipped into a long era of mediocrity. The Red Storm did not again advance to the Big East championship round until 2014, where once again, they came up short. With head coach, Amy Kvilhaug returning a solid core, St. John's came back to sweep through the Big East regular season and post-season in 2015, giving them their first crown since 1982. The post-season tournament win also secured an automatic bid into the NCAA tournament, the first ever for the Johnnies. St. John's continued their winning ways while advancing into the Big East tournament's final round in both 2016 and 2017. Both times however they came up short and were not able to land at-large bids into the NCAA tournament. Despite another winning season in 2018, the Red Storm took a slight step back while failing to reach the conference's final round for the first time in five years. Coach Kvilhaug stepped down after the season and was replaced with longtime assistant, Bob Guerriero. During his first year at the helm, Guerriero guided St. John's to another Big East regular season crown in 2019 although they again came up short in the league's post-season tournament.

Fordham's softball program began in 1985. They played in the MAAC until the school changed conference affiliation to the Patriot League following the 1990 season. The Patriot League stint only lasted five years before the school again changed affiliation, this time to the Atlantic 10 in 1996. Before that Fordham suffered through 10 losing seasons, one .500 season and zero winning seasons. Initially, the jump to the A-10 only made matters worse, where Fordham haplessly struggled to a 12-60 combined record during 1996 and 1997. The run of incompetence continued until head coach, Bridget Baxter, was hired to turn things around following the 2001 season. After another losing campaign in 2002, Fordham finally posted their first winning mark in 2003. It was their first of what would become 16 straight winning seasons for Baxter (later known by her married name, Bridget Orchard) at Fordham. In that time Orchard took the Rams to the NCAA tournament 8 times. Their first appearance came in 2010 as an at-large bid. That was followed with post-season A-10 conference titles and automatic NCAA bids in 2011, 2013, 2014, 2015, 2016, 2017 and 2018. Ironically, their one miss during the run was in 2012 when Fordham posted its most impressive win ever, an 8–5 victory over then 3rd ranked Alabama. The Crimson Tide would go on to win the national title later that same season.

While success at the NCAA's has eluded Fordham, the Rams have evolved into the region's top softball program. During the 2010s, no other Northeastern squad has qualified into the NCAA tournament as often as Fordham. Following the 2018 season Coach Orchard left Fordham to take the same position at her alma mater, Villanova. She was replaced by former Iona head coach, Melissa Inouye, who in 2019 continued Fordham's success with another Atlantic 10 title and automatic NCAA tournament bid.

Fordham victories	St. John's victories

No.	Date	Location	Winner	Score
1	April 23, 1985	The Bronx, NY	St. John's	5–2
2	April 6, 1986	Queens, NY	St. John's	5–0
3	April 23, 1987	The Bronx, NY	St. John's	5–0
4	April 23, 1987	The Bronx, NY	Fordham	2–1
5	April 29, 1988	Queens, NY	St. John's	10–0
6	April 29, 1988	Queens, NY	St. John's	9–0
7	April 26, 1989	The Bronx, NY	St. John's	10–0
8	April 26, 1989	The Bronx, NY	St. John's	18–0
9	April 5, 1991	The Bronx, NY	St. John's	15–3
10	March 31, 1992	Queens, NY	St. John's	7–0
11	March 31, 1992	Queens, NY	St. John's	11–0
12	February 22, 2003	Greenville, NC	Fordham	4–1
13	February 23, 2003	Greenville, NC	St. John's	2–1
14	April 1, 2009	Queens, NY	Fordham	4–2
15	March 31, 2010	The Bronx, NY	Fordham	3–0

No.	Date	Location	Winner	Score
16	March 23, 2011	Queens, NY	Fordham	5–4
17	March 20, 2012	The Bronx, NY	Fordham	8–0
18	April 30, 2013	Queens, NY	St. John's	3–0
19	February 13, 2015	Tampa, Fl	Fordham	3–0
20	April 29, 2015	The Bronx, NY	Fordham	8–0
21	May 3, 2017	The Bronx, NY	St. John's	3–0
22	May 2, 2018	Queens, NY	St. John's	14–11
23	May 1, 2019	The Bronx, NY	Fordham	10–2
24	March 10, 2021	The Bronx, NY	Fordham	13–3
25	March 10, 2021	The Bronx, NY	St. John's	4–3
26	March 24, 2021	Queens, NY	Fordham	8–4
27	March 18, 2023	The Bronx, NY	St. John's	9–0
28	April 12, 2023	Queens, NY	St. John's	4–1
29	March 26, 2025	Queens, NY	Fordham	4–1
Series: St. John's leads 17–12
