= St. John's lacrosse case =

1990 criminal case in the United States

The St. John's lacrosse case was a 1990 criminal case in which some members of the St. John's University men's lacrosse team were accused of raping an African American female. The St. John's Lacrosse rape case was a sports scandal that caused significant controversy within the school, amongst feminists, New York City, and the lacrosse community. This case was a predecessor to the Duke lacrosse case. The case was the basis of a Law & Order episode called "Out of Control".

== Case ==
On March 1, 1990, an African American woman of Jamaican descent was the alleged victim of sexual assault by 6 white male students (3 of them being members of the St. John's lacrosse team) at a private house off campus. The female was brought over to a house by her friend on the St. John's rifle club where she was given an alcoholic drink. At the house she claimed that she was semi-conscious and sexually assaulted; later she stated that she was brought to another house and assaulted as well. Some members of the school community blamed the victim for the sexual assault, likening it to the Tawana Brawley scandal. This though was 3 years after the Tawana Brawley case.

== Trial ==
The case was said to be about consent. The victim's sexual history was put on trial. Some people wondered how much the victim could remember if she was out of consciousness. The two-week delay seemed to be problematic. One student, Thomas Dean, made a deal with prosecutors and stated the version of events told by the victim was true. The jury consisted of 10 white people and two black people. One student plead guilty and agreed to testify against the others. The charges against the students included sodomy. The alleged rapists were all acquitted of the crime.

== Aftermath ==
New York City Mayor David Dinkins, when he heard about the acquittal, stated "based upon my reading of the evidence presented in this case, I am shocked and dismayed.". Congressman Charles B. Rangel compared "the verdict to the acquittal of whites in the Old South" and said he would demand today that the Justice Department prosecute the men for violating the woman's civil rights." Several students were fully expelled from St. John's University after the incident.

== See also ==
- 1992 Los Angeles riots
- Crown Heights riot
- Penn State child sex abuse scandal
