= St. John's University (New York City) =

Catholic university in New York, US

- Former names: St. John's College (1870–1933); St. John's University, Brooklyn (1933–1954)
- Motto: Educatio Christiana Animae Perfectio
- Motto in English: Christian education perfects the soul
- Type: Private university
- Established: 1870; 156 years ago
- Founder: John Loughlin
- Religious affiliation: Catholic (Vincentian)
- Academic affiliations: ACCU; NAICU
- Endowment: $856.3 million (2025)
- President: Brian Shanley
- Provost: Simon Geir Møller
- Faculty: 1,400 (As of fall 2020)
- Students: 20,150 (As of fall 2020)
- Undergraduates: 15,700 (As of fall 2020)
- Postgraduates: 4,450 (As of fall 2020)
- Location: New York City, New York, United States; 40°43′19″N 73°47′44″W
- Campus: List; Main Queens, New York 105 acres (42 ha); Satellite Staten Island, New York Manhattan, New York Hauppauge, New York Rome, Italy Paris, France Limerick, Ireland
- Colors: Red White Navy Blue
- Nickname: Red Storm
- Sporting affiliations: NCAA Division I Big East Conference
- Website: www.stjohns.edu

St. John's University is a private Catholic university in Queens, New York City, United States. It was founded in 1870 by the Congregation of the Mission (C.M., the Vincentian Fathers) with a mission to provide the youth of New York with a Catholic university education. Originally located in the Brooklyn borough of New York City, the flagship campus was moved to its current location in the Queens borough during the 1950s. St. John's has an additional New York City campus in Manhattan. The university's Staten Island campus closed in May 2024. Additionally, the university has international campuses located in Rome, Italy; Paris, France; and Limerick, Ireland.

St. John's is organized into five undergraduate schools and six graduate schools offering more than 100 bachelor, master, and doctoral degree programs as well as professional certificates. In 2026, the university had 15,640 undergraduate and 3,749 graduate students, making St. John's the third largest Catholic university in terms of enrollment in the U.S. The student body represents 46 states, District of Columbia, Guam, Puerto Rico, U.S. Virgin Islands, and 119 countries. As of 2020, St. John's alumni total more than 190,000 worldwide.

== History ==
=== Foundations ===
St. John's University was founded in 1870, by the Vincentian Fathers of the Catholic Church in response to an invitation by the first Bishop of Brooklyn, John Loughlin, to provide the youth of the city with a Catholic intellectual and moral education. Originally established as the College of St. John the Baptist, the first campus was located at 75 Lewis Avenue, in Bedford-Stuyvesant, Brooklyn. Ground was broken for St. John's College Hall, the university's first building, on May 28, 1868. The cornerstone was laid on July 25, 1869. It opened for educational purposes on September 5, 1870.

=== Founding principles ===
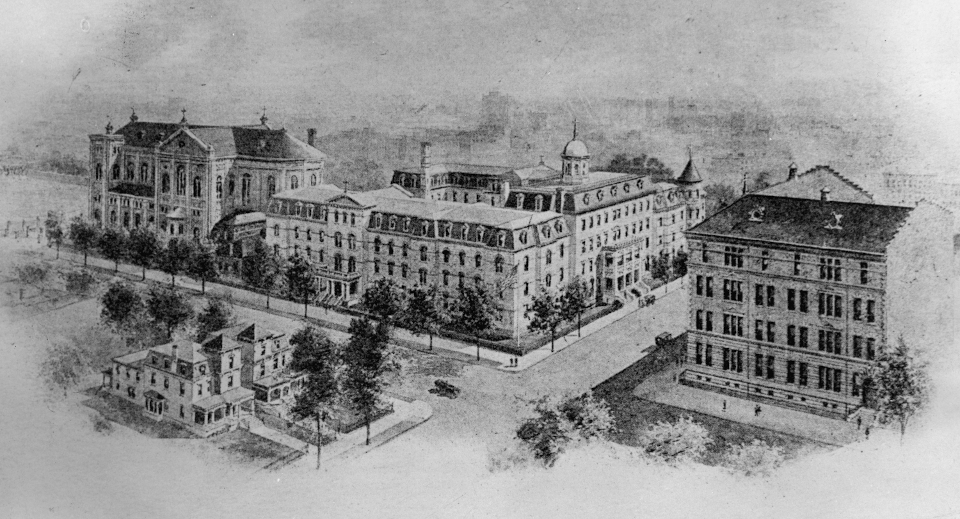
Panoramic sketch of St. John's College c. 1920s.

St. John's Vincentian values stem from the ideals and works of St Vincent de Paul, who is the patron saint of Christian charity. Following the Vincentian tradition, the university seeks to provide an education that encourages greater involvement in social justice, charity, and service. The Vincentian Center for Church and Society, located on the university's Queens campus serves as "a clearinghouse for and developer of Vincentian information, poverty research, social justice resources, and as an academic/cultural programming center".

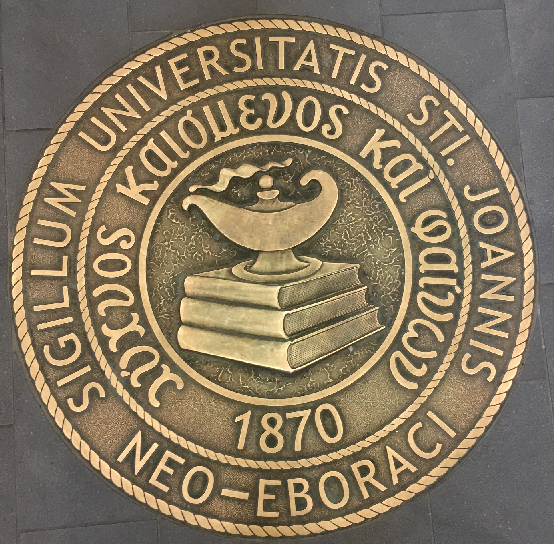
Seal of St. John's University, set in the floor of a campus building

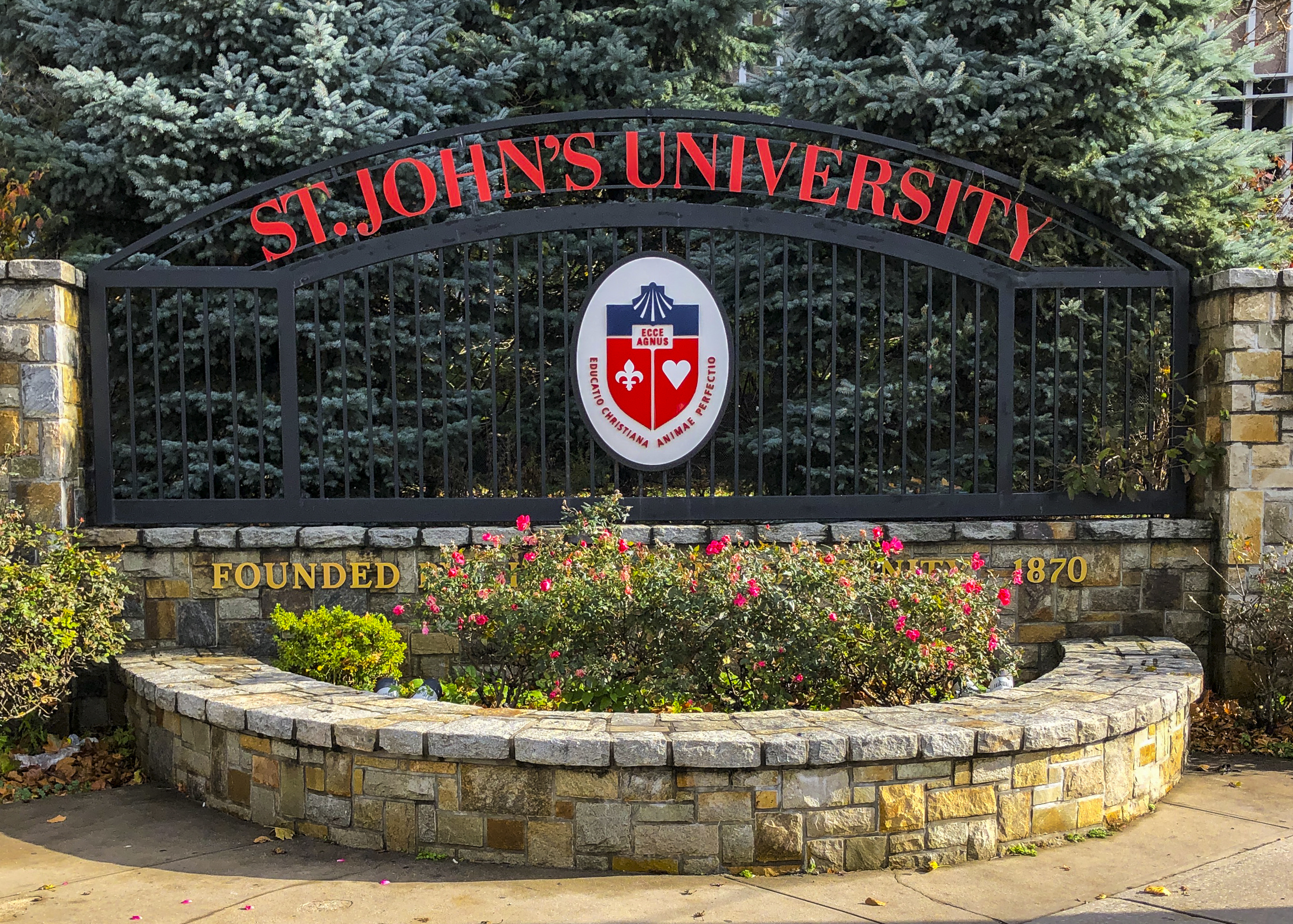
One of the gates on the Queens campus

The St. John's University Seal bears one phrase in Latin and one in Greek. The Latin phrases "Sigillum Universitatis Sti Joannis Neo Eboraci" translates in English to "Seal of St. John's University, New York". The Greek phrase translates to "A lamp, burning, and shining", a reference to the way Jesus describes St. John the Baptist in John 5:35. The University Crest bears the Latin phrase "Educatio Christiana Animae Perfectio", which translates to "A Christian education perfects the soul".

As a Catholic school run by the Vincentians, clergy can be found in positions within the administration, faculty, and spiritual staff. Crosses adorn many rooms and buildings throughout the campus and the university maintains close ties to the Catholic Church.

=== Growth ===
Beginning with the law school in 1925, St. John's began establishing other graduate and undergraduate schools, and became a university in 1933. In April 1936, St. John's bought the Hillcrest Golf Club's 100 acres (40 ha) of land for about $500,000, with the intention of eventually moving the school to the new site. Under the terms of the sale, the golf club continued to operate on the site for a few years. On February 11, 1954, St. John's officially broke ground on a new campus in Hillcrest, Queens, on the former site of the Hillcrest Golf Club. During the official groundbreaking ceremony, the shovel used was the same shovel that had broken ground on the original campus in 1868. The following year, the original school of the university, St. John's College, moved from Bedford-Stuyvesant to the new campus. (The old campus would change ownership over the years and remains extant but has been converted to residential use.)

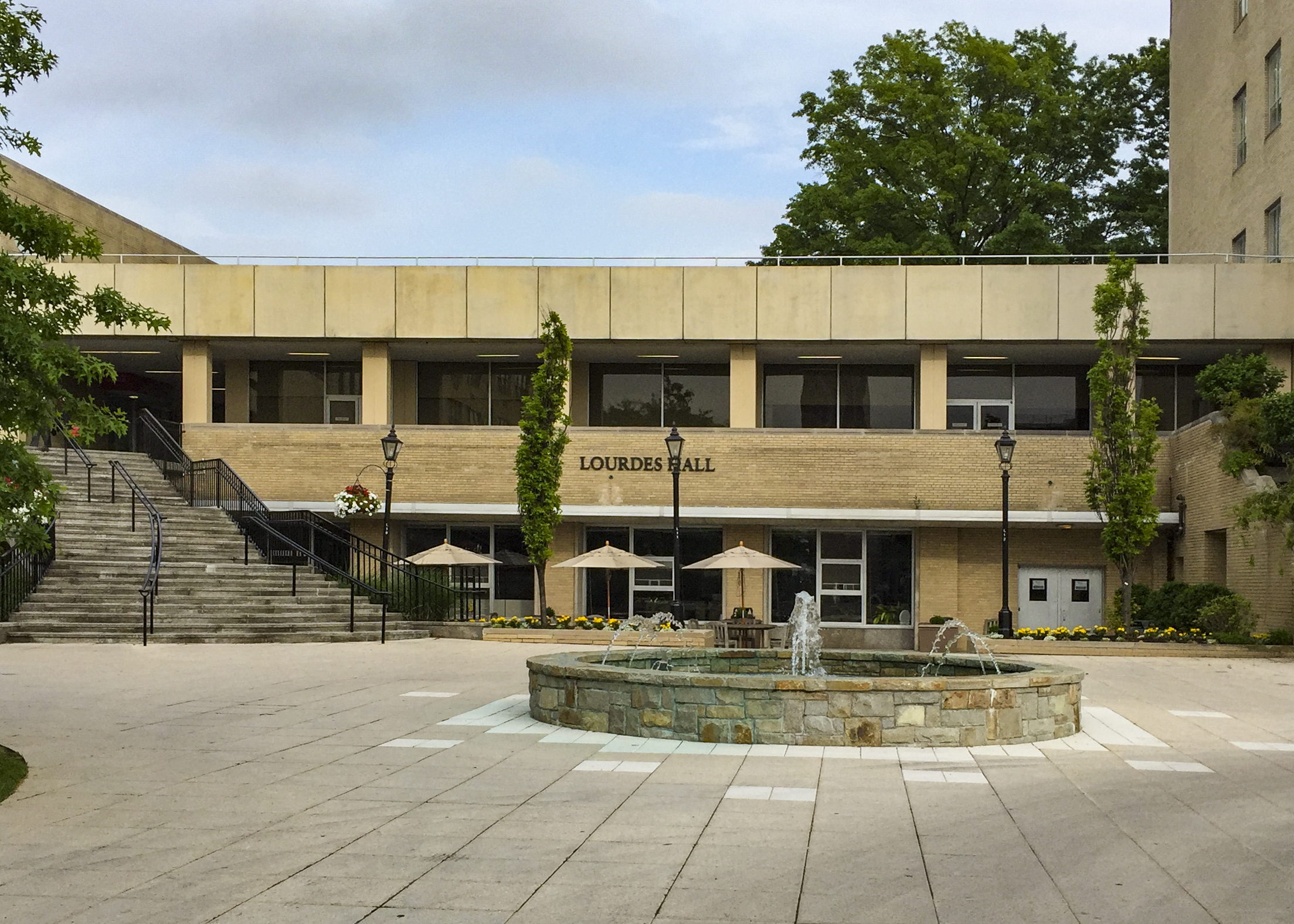
The front of Lourdes Hall located on the Queens Campus

Over approximately the next two decades, the other schools of the university, which were located at a separate campus at 96 Schermerhorn Street in Downtown Brooklyn, moved out to the new campus in Queens. The last of the schools to relocate to Queens moved there in 1972, bringing an end to the Downtown Brooklyn campus of the university. In 1959, the university established a Freedom Institute to provide lectures and programs that would, in the words of university president John A. Flynn, focus "attention on the dangers of communism threatening free institutions here and abroad," with Arpad F. Kovacs of the St. John's history department as its director. (A volume of lectures given at the Freedom Institute was edited by Kovacs and published in 1961 as Let Freedom Ring.) The university also hired the noted historian Paul Kwan-Tsien Sih to establish an Institute of Asian Studies in that same year, and similarly set up a Center for African Studies under the directorship of the economic geographer Hugh C. Brooks.

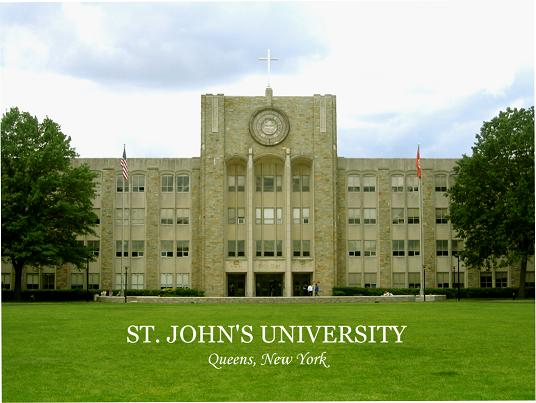
St. Augustine Library

The university received praise from Time Magazine in 1962 for being a Catholic university that accepted Jews with low household income. Time also ranked St. John's as "good−small" on a list of the nation's Catholic universities in 1962.

The St. John's University strike of 1966–1967 was a protest by faculty at the university which began on January 4, 1966, and ended in June 1967. The strike began after 31 faculty members were dismissed in the fall of 1965 without due process, dismissals which some felt were a violation of the professors' academic freedom. The strike ended without any reinstatements, but led to the widespread unionization of public college faculty in the New York City area. In 1970, arbitrators ruled that the university had not acted improperly.

On January 27, 1971, the New York State Board of Regents approved the consolidation of the university with the former Notre Dame College (New York), a private women's college, and the Staten Island campus of St. John's University became a reality. Classes began in the fall of 1971, combining the original Notre Dame College with the former Brooklyn campus of St. John's, offering undergraduate degrees in liberal arts, business and education. The Grymes Hill campus on Staten Island was closed in 2024.

=== Further expansion (1999–present) ===
Spirit Rock located on the Queens Campus

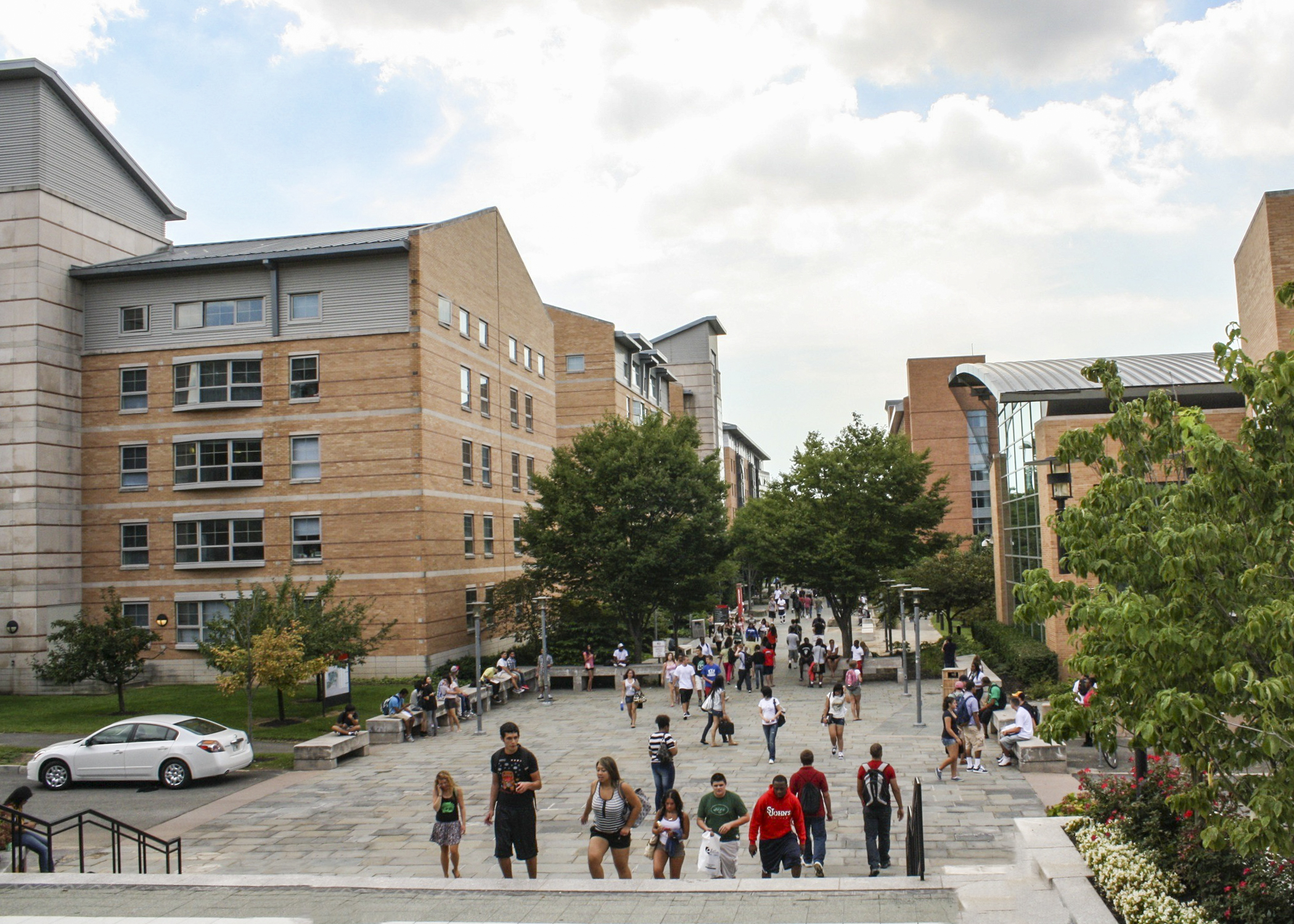
The Residential Village on the Queens campus

Circa 1989, according to Steve Fishman of New York Magazine, "St. John's was essentially a commuter school" but that changed after Donald Harrington became the president of the university that year, replacing Joseph Cahill. During his tenure, the school increased its infrastructure and international profile. By 1990, the tuition and fees at St. John's was less than half of that at schools like NYU and Columbia. Moreover, in 1999, the university completed the first residence halls on the main Queens campus, making it easier for out-of-state and international students to attend the flagship campus. The university is now led by Brian Shanley, former president of Providence College.

Beginning in 1995, the university began a series of acquisitions lasting for the following 22 years and establishing new locations throughout New York and the world.

- Rome Campus. In 1995, St. John's establishes its first international campus in Rome, Italy. The campus offers both undergraduate and graduate degrees.
- Manhattan Campus. St. John's acquired The College of Insurance in Manhattan, in 2001. The school was converted to the School of Risk Management and added several programs to the St. John's academic portfolio, including Actuarial Science. The campus also included additional dormitories in downtown Manhattan.
- Paris Location. In 2008, the university established a location in Paris, France, with residential accommodations and multiple programs. The locations purpose allowing students to complete a portion of their studies under St. John's faculty in France while being exposed to the cultural offerings of the city.

== Organization and administration ==
St. John's University is a Catholic non-profit organization controlled by privately appointed board of trustees which is chosen by the Vincentian order. Brian J. Shanley is the 18th and current president of the university.

Prior presidents include:

- John T. Landry, 1870–1875
- Patrick M. O'Regan, 1875–1877
- Aloysius J. Meyer, 1877–1882
- Jeremiah A. Hartnett, 1882–1897
- James J. Sullivan, 1897–1901
- Patrick McHale, 1901–1906
- John W. Moore, 1906–1925
- John J. Cloonan, 1925–1931
- Thomas F. Ryan, 1931–1935
- Edward J. Walsh, 1935–1942
- William J. Mahoney, 1942–1947
- John A. Flynn, 1947–1961
- Edward J. Burke, 1961–1965
- Joseph T. Cahill, 1965–1989
- Donald J. Harrington, 1989–2013
- Joseph L. Levesque, 2013–2014
- Conrado Gempesaw, 2014–2021
- Brian J. Shanley, 2021–present

Per the university's statutes, presidents must be priests from the Congregation of the Mission (Vincentians). The trustees waived this requirement due to the limited number of candidates. In 2014, Conrado Gempesaw, became the first ever lay person to be appointed President of St. John's University and in 2021, Brian Shanley became the first non-Vincentian Catholic priest appointed president. Shanley is a member of the Dominican Order.

== Academics ==
St. John's is a large doctoral/research university. It is accredited by the Middle States Commission on Higher Education and has 13 additional specialized accreditations.

=== Colleges ===
The university is organized into six colleges and schools:

- St. John's College of Liberal Arts and Sciences
- School of Education
- Peter J. Tobin College of Business
- College of Pharmacy and Health Sciences
- The Lesley H. and William L. Collins College of Professional Studies (St. Vincent's College)
- St. John's University School of Law

=== Student body ===
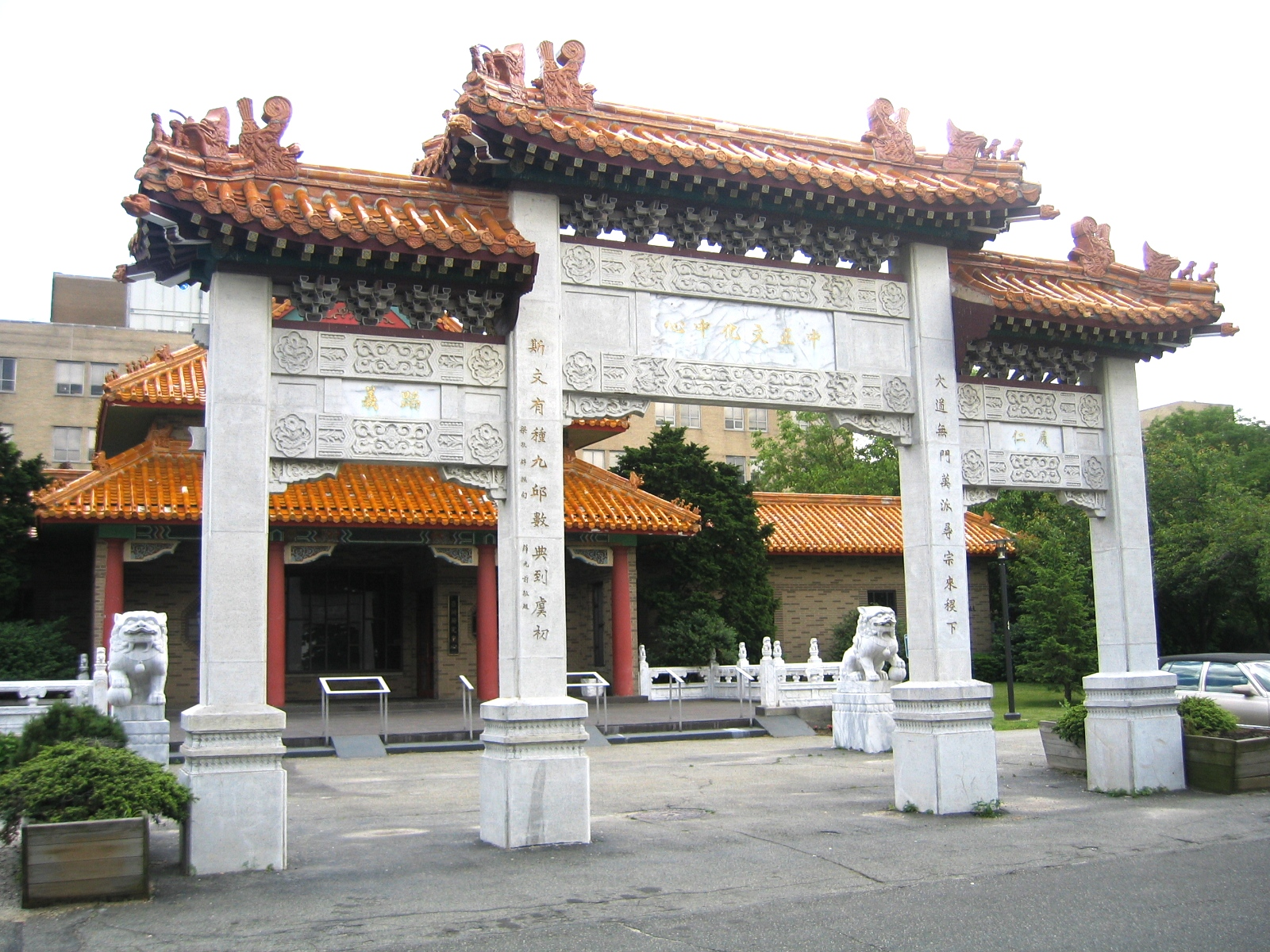
Entrance to Sun Yat Sen Hall where the Institute of Asian Studies is located

Student body composition as of May 2, 2022
Race and ethnicity	Total
White	42%
Hispanic	17%
Asian	16%
Black	14%
Other (Note: Other consists of Multiracial Americans & those who prefer not to say.)	7%
Foreign national	4%
Economic diversity
Low-income (Note: The percentage of students who received an income-based federal Pell grant intended for low-income students.)	37%
Affluent (Note: The percentage of students who are a part of the American middle class or higher.)	63%

In fall 2019, St. John's student body numbered 21,721 students (17,088 undergraduates and 4,633 graduate students). In 2019, there were 3,135 new undergraduates—the largest freshman class at any US Catholic college or university. Students came from 46 states, the District of Columbia, Guam, Puerto Rico, the US Virgin Islands, and 119 countries. The freshman retention rate was 84 percent. In 2016, the university conferred more than 4,000 undergraduate and graduate degrees.

In 2019, St. John's received 27,000 applications for freshman admission, with an anticipated enrollment of more than 3,000 students. With an admission rate of 72%, St. John's is considered 'more selective' by U.S. News & World Report. Half the applicants admitted had SAT scores between 1080 and 1300.

St. John's operates an Equity & Inclusion Council, the Office of Multicultural Affairs, the Academic Center for Equity and Inclusion, Inclusivity Resource Center, Academic Center for Equity and Inclusion, Respond and Partner to Engage our Community Team (RESPECT), as well as providing a resource division for LGBTQ+ students. The school actively promotes homeless student enrollment and in general has an emphasis on enrolling students from less favorable financial circumstances.

=== Faculty ===
St. John's employs 1,471 full-time and part-time faculty members, more than 92 percent of whom possess a doctorate or other terminal degree in their field. The student-to-faculty ratio is 17:1. Although the majority of the faculty and staff of St. John's are non-clergy academics, the school does have a significant number of priests, religious brothers and sisters who are professors/academics in various fields. Although a Catholic institution, the university also employs a number of non-Catholic faculty.

=== Rankings and reputation ===
Academic rankings

National
- Forbes: 202
- U.S. News & World Report: 153
- Washington Monthly: 316
- WSJ/College Pulse: 190

In the 2021 U.S. News & World Report ranking of "National Universities", St. John's undergraduate program was ranked tied for 170th overall in the nation, tied for 39th out of 389 in "Top Performers on Social Mobility", tied for 124th out of 142 in "Best Colleges for Veterans", and 142nd out of 180 in "Best Value Schools".

The School of Law was ranked #62 for 2026. The School of Education ranked tied for 105th in the U.S. by U.S. News & World Report for 2021.

Forbes ranked St. John's 202nd on its "America's Top Colleges" list in 2024–25 out of the 500 best private and public colleges, universities and service academies. In order to be considered for the rankings, the school had to qualify as one of the top 15% of the 4,300 degree-granting postsecondary institutions in the US.

== Student life ==
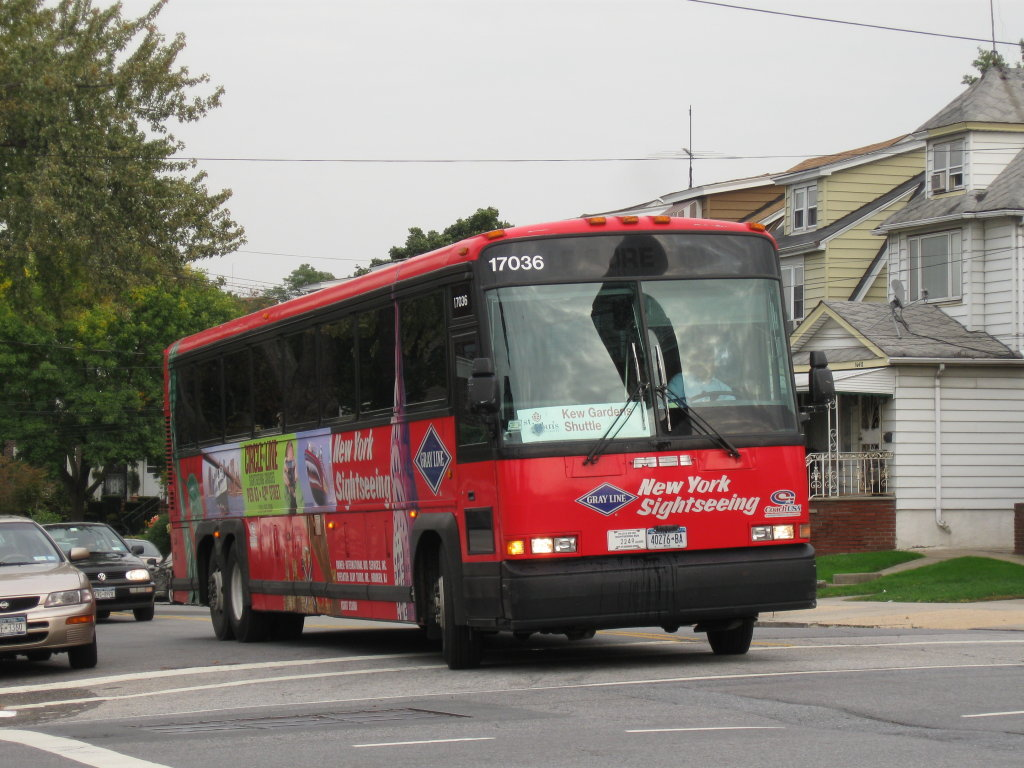
SJU provides shuttle bus service for students to access satellite houses, other campuses in New York City, subway and commuter rail, and certain destinations in Manhattan.

Though a Catholic institution, the students are of all faiths. St. John's offers and funds, through the Student Government, more than 180 academic, professional, and recreational student organizations, as well as the St. John's Bread and Life program which is dedicated to serving the poor by providing food, services, and support resources. Mass is celebrated on the Queens Campus three times daily and the sacrament of confession is available daily. There are many devotions held at the university as well, such as Adoration, the Rosary and Miraculous Medal Novena. The Student Government also works to host many notable guest speakers throughout the academic year.

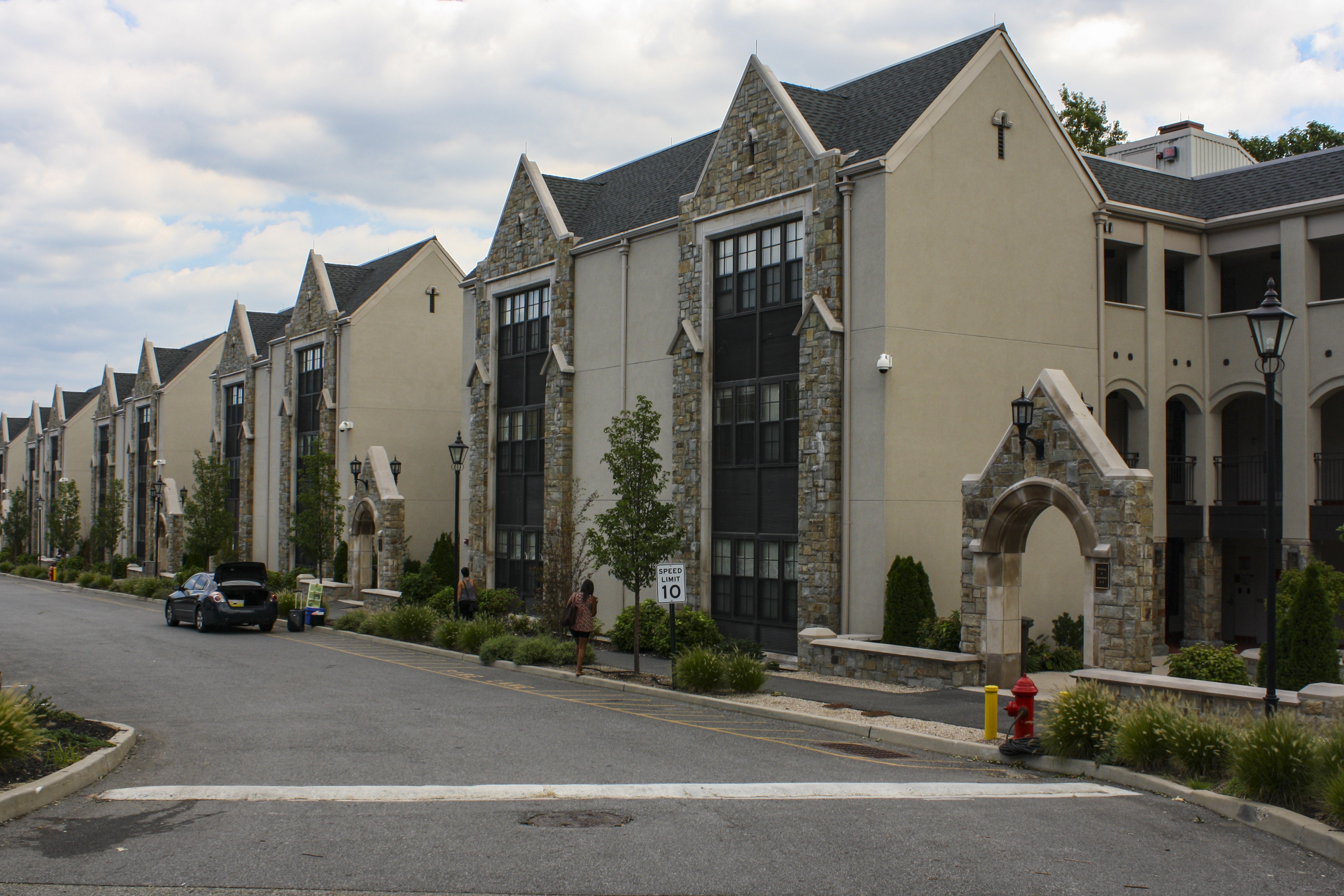
The Founders Village Townhouses located on the Queens Campus

=== Fraternities and sororities ===
St. John's does not allow fraternity and sorority residences like most schools, rather offering them as clubs. There are 32 recognized fraternity and sorority chapters at St. John's.

=== Media ===
- The Torch is the official student-run newspaper of St. John's University. Founded in 1922, the paper has shifted in and out of the control of the university, but has been financially independent since 1980. In 1988, The Torch was inducted into the Associated Collegiate Press Hall of Fame after being awarded a number of awards from various collegiate newspaper organizations.
- WREDtv is the official television station of St. John's University. Founded in 1970, the station is completely student-run and creates original programming centered on Student Life at the university; ranging from news and sports programs to various comedy and general interest shows. Shows are produced and shot in the television studio in the school's TV center, as well as productions shot around the St. John's campus and New York City.
- Rho Chi Post is the official student-run newsletter of the St. John's University College of Pharmacy and Health Sciences. The newsletter accepts articles from students from all majors and contributors do not have to be a member of Rho Chi Society to submit their work. All articles are peer-reviewed.
- The Storm Front is the official student-run newspaper of St. John's University Staten Island Campus. It was organized in 1999 and succeeded The Arrow as the campus newspaper after The Arrow was later seen as a throw-back to the university's former Redmen theme.
- Proteus is the literary magazine of the Staten Island Campus. It is released as a compilation of student-submitted works through the St. John's University Creative Expression's Guild.
- WSJU Radio, which opened in 1974, is the official radio station of St. John's University; the staff and crew consists of St. John's University students. The broadcasts are played in Marillac Cafeteria and simulcast on the internet. WSJU is an official member of The National Association of College Broadcasters (NACB) and the Intercollegiate Broadcasting System (IBS).
- Sequoya is an independent and student-run literary magazine at St. John's University in New York City. Its mission is to showcase talents of St. John's students in the fields of literature and arts. The magazine is published annually by a collaboration of Departments of English and Fine Arts.

=== Performing arts ===
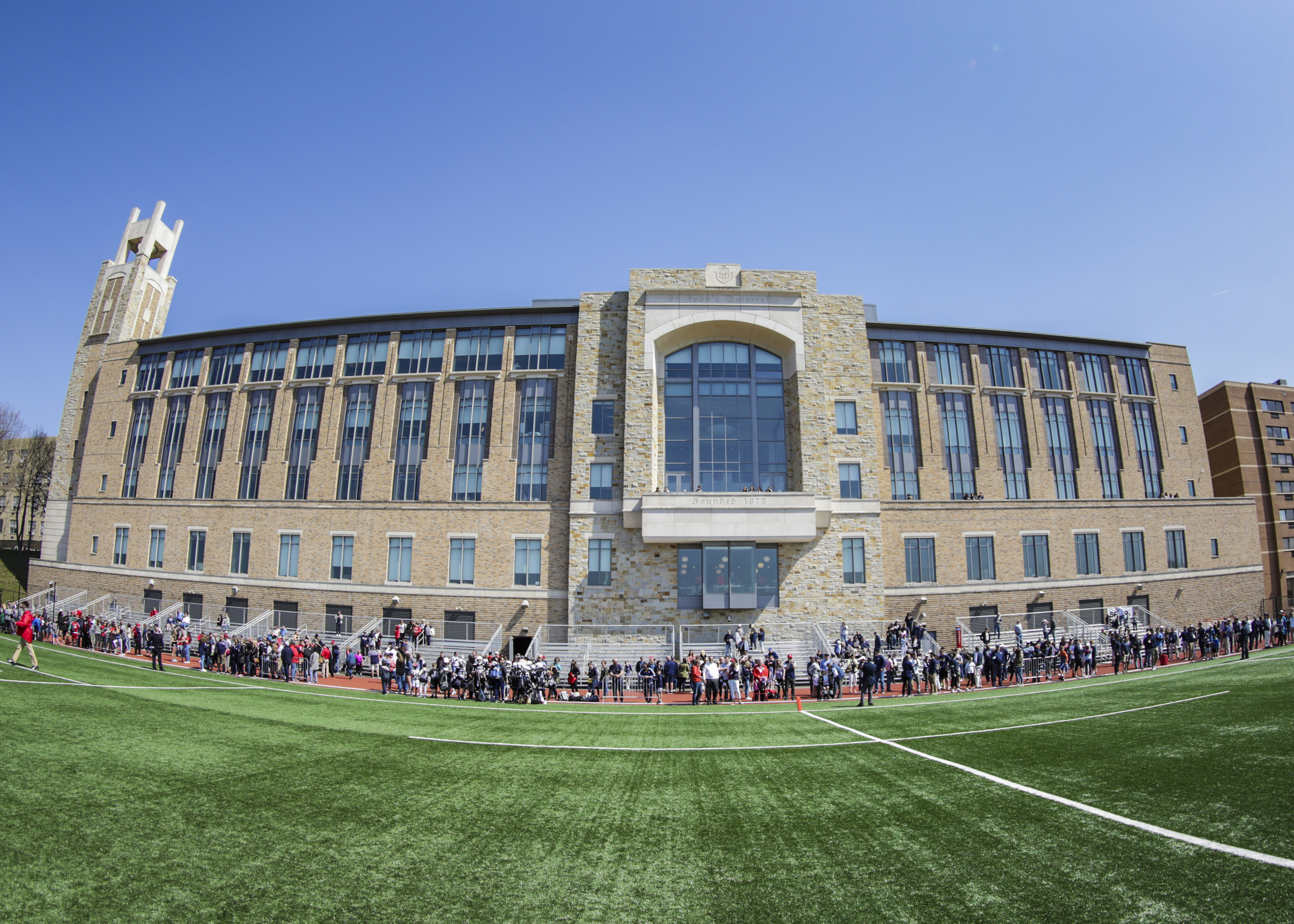
The back of the D'Angelo Center on the Queens Campus which overlooks DaSilva Memorial Field

- The St. John's University Jazz Band has been the Queen's campus' jazz ensemble since 1987. The band performs at numerous on-campus events and holds performances both as headliners and alongside the other performing arts groups. Their repertoire spans the many different incarnations of jazz music, and the group contains some of the university's most elite musicians. They are not to be confused with the pep band, which performs at the Red Storm sporting events.
- The St. John's University Mixed Chorus has been a part of the university's tradition since 1911, and is one of the two sanctioned vocal groups under performing arts. The group performs both on and off campus, as well as abroad. Their repertoire includes many classical and traditional songs, and songs with pertinence to the school's history, with recent forays into popular music.
- The Voices of Victory Gospel Choir has been the Queens campus' premier gospel music group since 1988, and is one of the two sanctioned vocal groups under performing arts. The group is known for their dramatic and impassioned performances both on and off campus, and abroad. Their repertoire contains history's many different embodiments of spiritual music in both traditional and contemporary respects.
- The Chappell Players Theater Group has been the Queen campus' dramatic arts organization since the 1930s. The group is known for their stage plays and musicals put on throughout the academic year and their hands-on approach to both on-stage performance and behind the scenes tech.
- The Chamber Music Society is a newer organization to St. John's. This group is made up of instrumentalists including violinists, violists, and cellists, singers, and composers who form small ensembles to perform at the semester concerts. CMS has performed at several events on the Queens campus such as Accepted Students Day, the investiture for Gempesaw, Women's History Month, Presidential Donor dinners, and Skull & Circle Convocation.

=== Art exhibitions ===
Founded in 1994, the Dr. M.T. Geoffrey Yeh Art Gallery is the university's art exhibition space. The Yeh Art Gallery partners with international contemporary artists to create exhibitions and learning opportunities for the university community and public.

== Campuses ==
The main campus of St. John's University is located in the residential Hillcrest section of the borough of Queens of New York City. This 105-acre (0.42 km^{2}) campus houses several academic buildings, 8 residence halls, athletic facilities, and the St. Augustine Library. The Queens campus features stone buildings and student residence halls. Facilities include laboratory and classroom buildings, the main collections of its 1.7 million-volume library; and athletic facilities for students and St. John's Division I athletic teams. The University Center is the 127,000 square foot, five story D'Angelo Center, which features banquet space, classrooms, club space, a food court, game rooms, lecture halls, and a first floor lounge.

=== Branch campuses ===
- Manhattan – St. John's Manhattan campus houses St. John's School of Risk Management, a division of The Peter J. Tobin College of Business. It is located at 101 Astor Place in the East Village area of New York City. The campus occupies 71,000-square-feet on the first three floors of the 12-story, 400,000-square-foot building. The campus is close to other major institutions of higher education, including The Cooper Union for the Advancement of Art and Science, New York University, and The New School. The facility was dedicated and blessed on October 9, 2014, after relocating from an awarded vertical campus at 101 Murray Street on Manhattan's lower West Side.

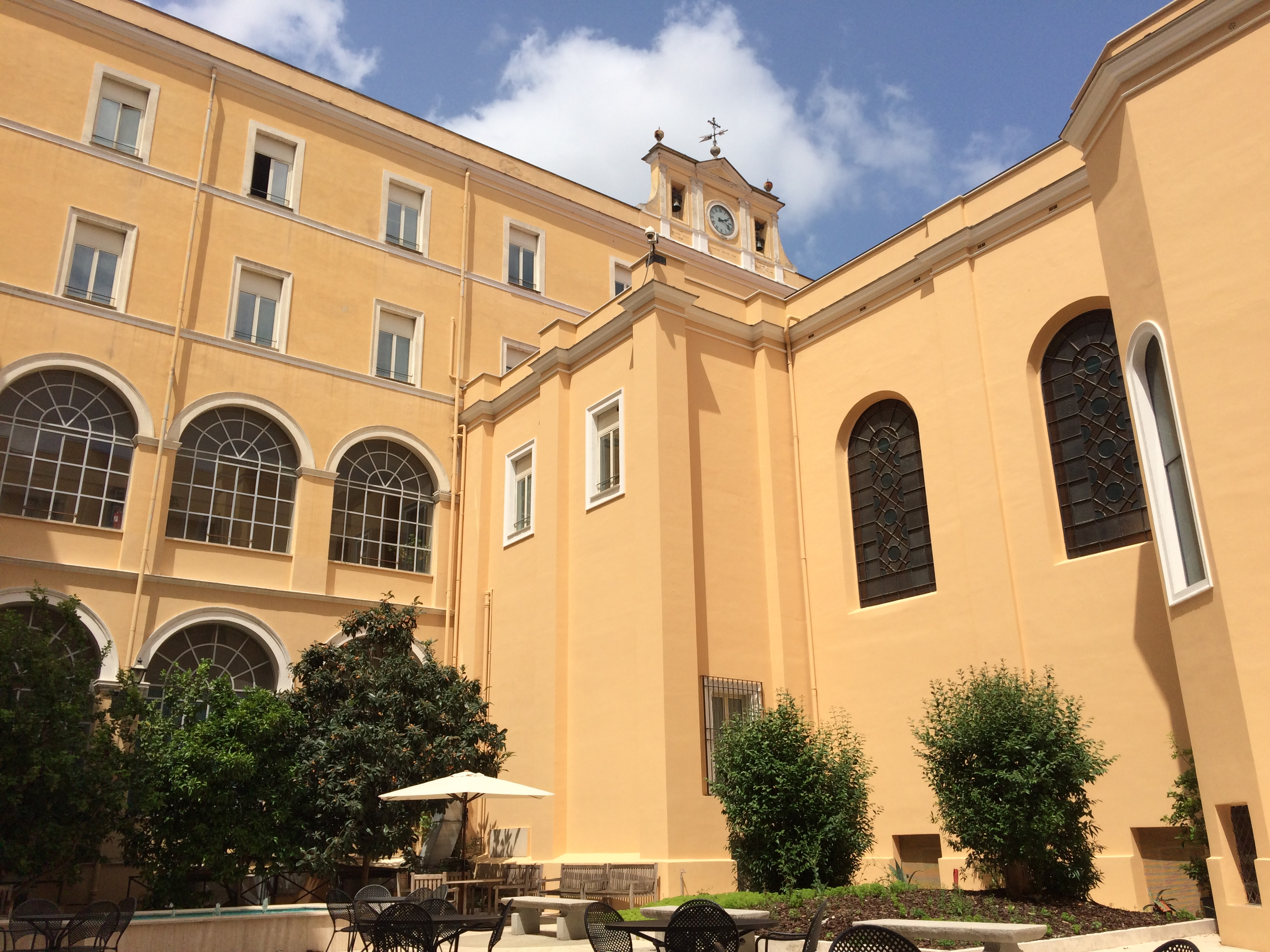
The central courtyard of St. John's University – Rome

- Rome, Italy – St. John's University – Rome functions as a graduate degree-granting institution and supports undergraduate study-abroad programs. Study abroad programs on the Rome campus are offered on the undergraduate level for fall, winter, spring and summer terms in several academic fields. The campus also offers graduate programs leading to a Master of Arts or Master of Business Administration degree. The campus is located on a city block in the rione of Prati and houses both academic, residential and administrative space on four floors. On-campus dormitory housing is available to all accepted undergraduate and graduate students. The campus was founded with the help of the Catholic University of America and helps to keep close ties between the university and the Vatican.
- Paris, France – In 2008, St. John's announced the formation of full-time and semester-abroad programs at a new academic location in Paris, France. The location is situated within the Vincentian Motherhouse in Paris.
- Additionally, there is the Long Island Graduate Center in leased space totaling 11,000 square feet (1,000 m^{2}) in an office facility in Hauppauge, New York.

=== Former branch campuses ===
- Staten Island – Originally Notre Dame College, the Staten Island Campus had expanded to include 16.5 acres (67,000 m^{2}) serving over 2,000 students who are enrolled in undergraduate and graduate degree programs. The 16.5-acre (67,000 m^{2}) campus features lawns, apartment-style student residences, and architectural styles that range from red-brick colonial to the modern. The campus is located in the residential Grymes Hill section of Staten Island. Due to declining enrollment, the campus closed in May 2024. On May 12, 2026 the campus was sold to Wagner College.
- Previously the graduate center was in a campus, the Oakdale Campus, divided between Oakdale and West Sayville. This campus was the ex-La Salle Center (earlier La Salle Military Academy); the university acquired that campus for $14,300,000 in 1999. La Salle had remained in operation until 2001. Before La Salle's closure, the university leased the campus to the school. The graduate programs at the Oakdale Center included certifications and teaching teachers. Additionally, the center was used as conference pace. In 2016, St. Johns sold the campus to Amity University. The graduate programs moved to Hauppauge.

=== Campus renovations ===
In 2008, St. John's University broke ground for the new University Center/Academic Building, one of the largest and most comprehensive construction projects in St. John's recent history. Located between Sullivan Hall and the Taffner Field House on the site that currently serves as stadium seating for lacrosse and track and field events, the 110,000 square feet (10,000 m^{2}) complex contains 14 classrooms with approximately 800 seats. In addition, it includes a café, lounge, recreation and entertainment spaces, student organization offices and conference and meeting rooms devoted exclusively to student use. The building is named "The D'Angelo Center" after board of trustees member Peter D'Angelo '78 MBA, and his wife Peg D'Angelo '70 Ed.

In 2005, St. John's constructed Taffner Field house, and dramatically renovated Carnesecca Arena (formerly Alumni Hall) and the University Center. Renovations to Carnesecca Hall included a 6,400 sq ft (590 m^{2}). Health Center, for use by Student Life and athletics, including weight training equipment, aerobic and dance studios, and a student lounge. The University Center renovations consisted of reconfigured office and meeting space for Student Life and academic clubs, and the addition of audio/visual rooms for all varsity athletic teams. Taffner Athletic Field House was $23 million initiative. The two-story, 38,000 sq ft (3,500 m^{2}). structure adjacent to Carnesecca Hall includes four basketball courts, academic classrooms and locker rooms.

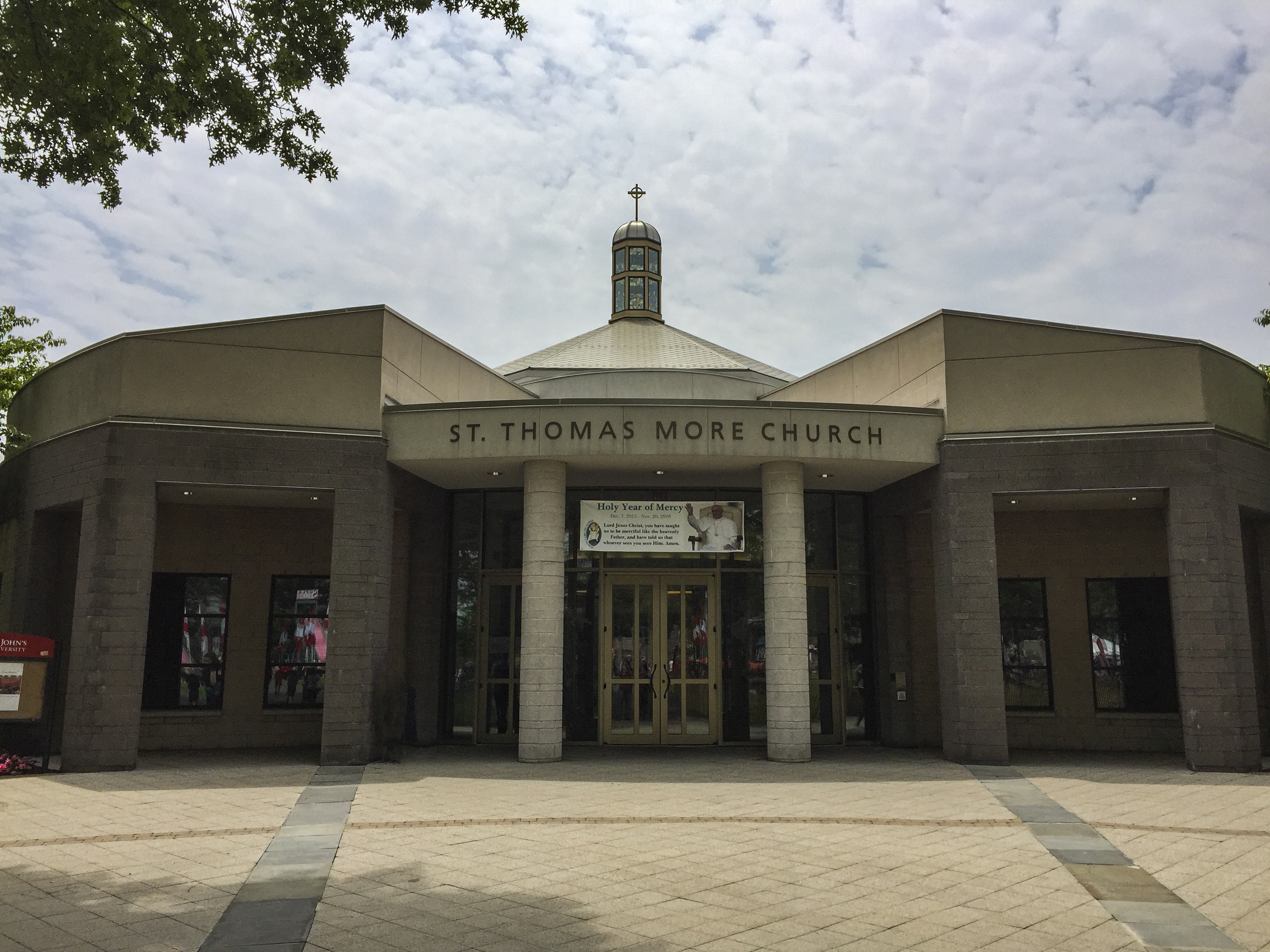
The university church of St. Thomas More located on the Great Lawn of the Queens Campus

The 2004–2005 academic years saw $35 million in capital projects, including the completion of St. Thomas More church, the DaSilva building, Carnesecca Hall Fitness Center, and Belson Stadium. In 2005, the science labs and student life facilities were the target of an additional $60 million in capital enhancements. In regards to its expansion plans, the university has had a contentious relationship with the surrounding community in the past. In 2007, however, it was discovered that the university was planning to lease a building under construction by a separate company for an off-campus dormitory. Residents argue that such a plan goes against the school's pledge of being a "good neighbor" towards the community. The university, however, contends that it did not break the pledge for it was only leasing the structure not building it. Nevertheless, opponents, including state Senator Frank Padavan, argue that such an explanation is "disingenuous". St. Vincent Hall was also converted from a Vincentian and clergy residence to student dormitories. The Vincentian fathers and other clergy moved to the Father John Murray Hall built for them on campus where they now live.

The university has seen much growth on its campuses in order to attract students from outside the New York area. In 1999, the first dormitory was completed on the Queens campus. As of 2025, the campus contains six dorms, three apartment complexes, and a townhouse complex.

In 2018, Bent Hall home of the Tobin College of Business underwent extensive renovations. Originally, Bent Hall was home to Tobin College and Collins College of Professional Studies. After the renovations Collins College was relocated to the second floor of St. Augustine Hall which was also renovated for the college. In 2021 Shanley announced that the College of Pharmacy will be relocated to a new Health Sciences Center that is slated to be built on the location of the former St. Vincent's Hall. The new St. Vincent Health Sciences Center, was opened the 2024 Fall Semester.

In 2023, Shanley announced "The Campus Master Plan". The plan seeks to build a new basketball practice facility, replacing the existing Taffner Field House. Taffner Field House would then be renovated into a campus recreation center, with a completion date of Spring 2027. There are further plans to renovate St. Albert Hall and St. John Hall, as well as build a new academic building seated between St. Thomas More Church and St. John Hall.

== Athletics ==
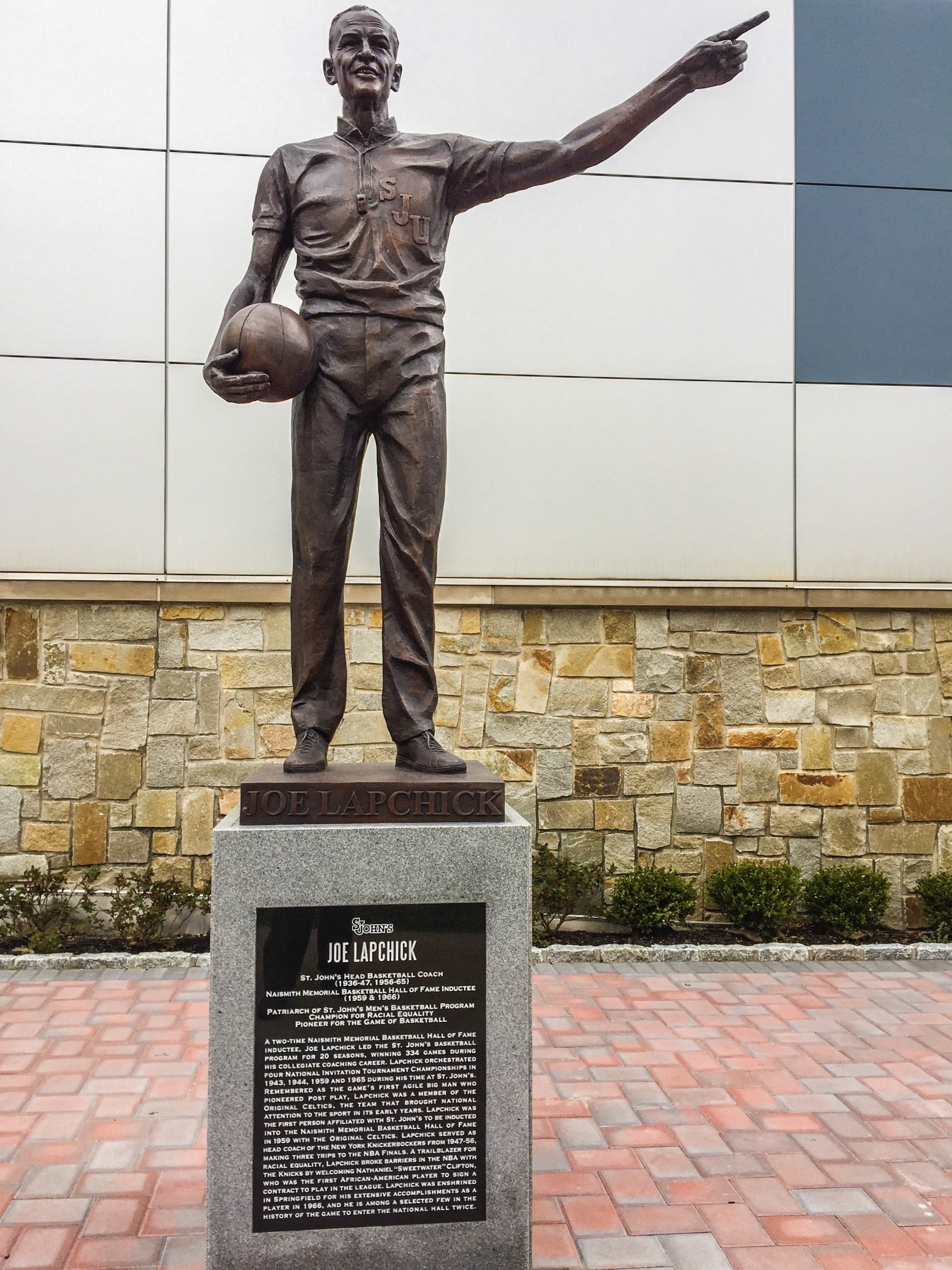
A statue dedicated to former St. John's men's basketball coach Joe Lapchick is located on the Queens campus.

St. John's University fields 17 NCAA Division I teams in various sports while also providing intramural and club sports. The Division 1 sports include;

- Men's Programs: Baseball, Basketball, Fencing, Golf, Lacrosse, Soccer, and Tennis
- Women's Programs: Basketball, Cross Country, Fencing, Golf, Soccer, Softball, Tennis, Track & Field, and Volleyball

St. John's sports teams are called the Red Storm. Though not official, the moniker "Johnnies" is also commonly used by fans. Prior to 1994, St. John's went by the nickname "Redmen", which referenced the red uniforms worn by the university in competition. However, the name was interpreted as a Native American reference as early as the late 1920s, and aside from having a cigar store Indian as a mascot for many decades, the school also had student publications over the years with titles such as The Wampum Belt, The Warrior, The War Bonnet, and The Indian. The team's name was changed to the Red Storm after mounting pressure on colleges and universities to adopt names more sensitive to Native American culture.

=== Conference affiliation ===
St. John's NCAA Division I teams compete in the Big East Conference, with the exception of the fencing team, which competes in the ECAC. From 1979 to 2013, St. John's was a charter member of the original Big East Conference. In 2013 the Big East Conference split into two different conferences. St. John's and the other six non-FBS schools in the original Big East broke away to form the current Big East, while the remaining FBS schools joined various existing conferences.

=== Men's baseball ===
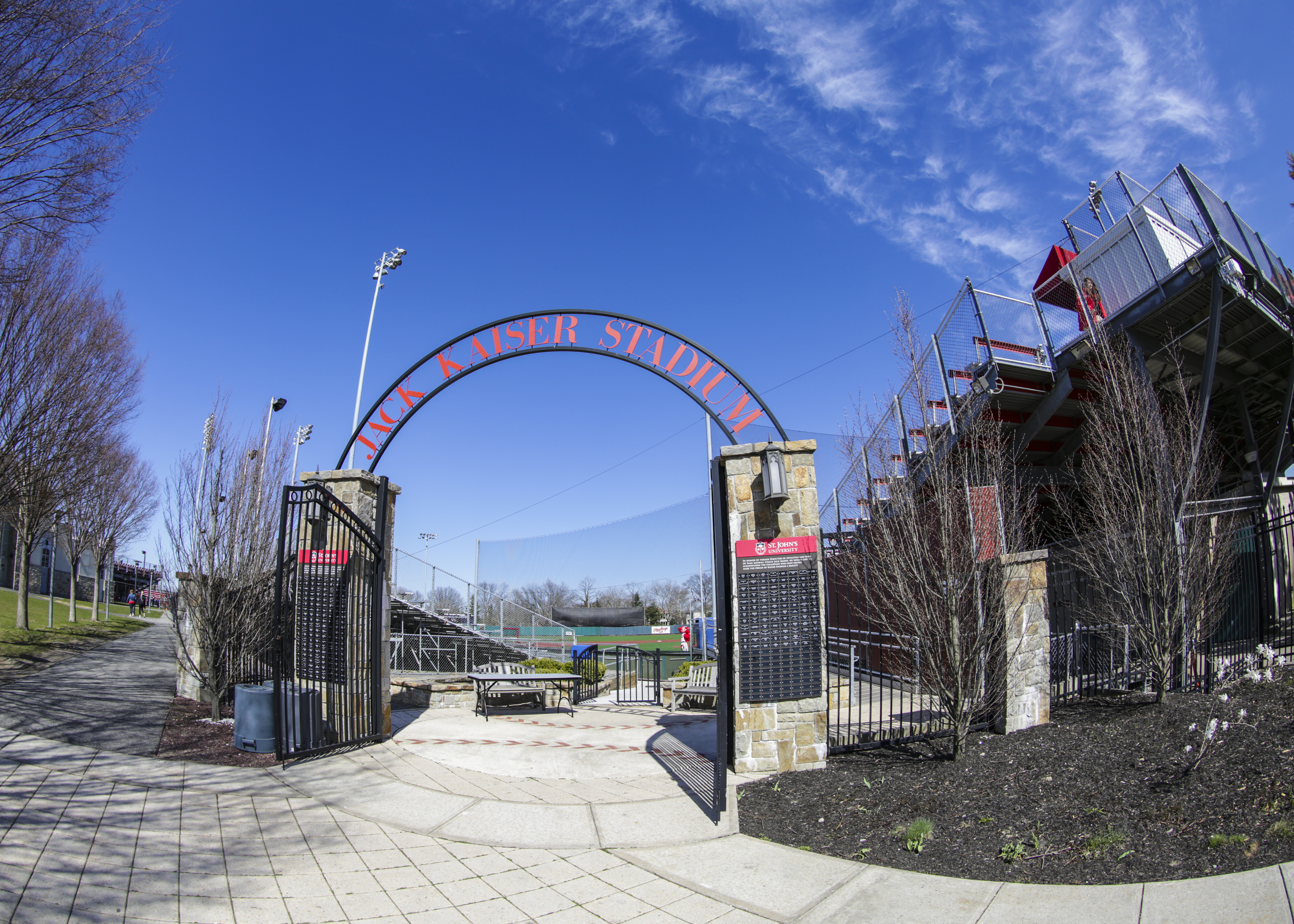
The front entrance of Jack Kaiser Stadium on the Queens Campus, home of the St. John's Red Storm baseball team

The St. John's baseball team has been to the College World Series six times, recorded 26 NCAA appearances and 6 Big East Championships, and sent more than 70 players on to professional baseball careers, most recently 2014 World Series Champion Joe Panik of the San Francisco Giants.

The 3,500-seat "Ballpark at St. John's" was renamed "Jack Kaiser Stadium" in 2007 after the Hall of Fame Coach and former St. John's Athletic Director. The stadium is one of the largest college baseball stadiums in the northeast, and is a featured venue on the EA Sports MVP NCAA Baseball video game. The stadium had been conceived out of a deal between the university and the Giuliani Administration, wherein the latter wanted to find a location for a single-A team that would be affiliated with the New York Mets. Expressing concern about quality of life issues and the spending of public money for a private religious institution, surrounding neighborhood civic groups and local politicians protested the plan. In order to placate their concerns, the Mets offered to open it up to the communities for local high school games and youth programs, and the stadium was built amid many large-scale protests by community residents and by State Senator Frank Padavan, while also using city financing. The Red Storm played the first-ever game at the Mets' new ballpark, Citi Field, on March 29, 2009.

St. John's major leaguers have included Rich Aurilia, Danny Burawa, John Franco, Sam Nahem, Joe Panik, Steve Ratzer, Wayne Rosenthal, Mickey Rutner, and Frank Viola.

=== Men's basketball ===
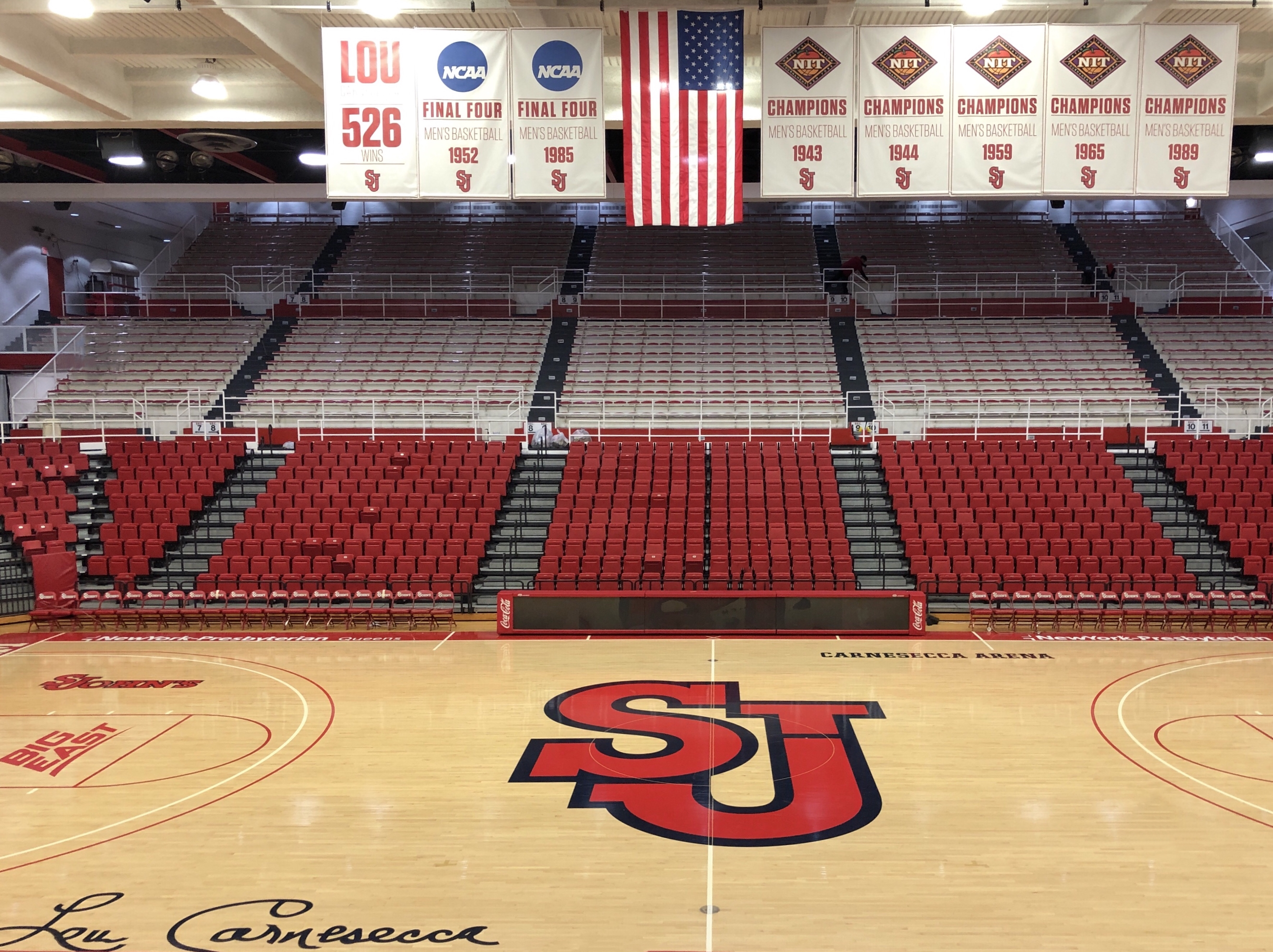
The inside of Carnesecca Arena, the on-campus home for the men's and women's basketball teams, the women's volleyball team and the men's and women's fencing teams

The men's basketball team has reached the NCAA tournament twenty-eight (28) times, has had 2 John R. Wooden Award winners, 11 consensus All-Americans, 6 members of the College Basketball Hall of Fame, and has 59 players join the NBA. As of 2019, the school was also the 8th winningest team in all of college basketball.

Even though the program has yet to win the NCAA Men's Division I Basketball Championship, the school boasts many other accolades, including the 1911 Helms Athletic Foundation National Championship and the 1943 and 1944 NIT National Championships (primary championship of the era) It also was runner-up in the 1952 National Championship game (prior to tournament structure). With its 28 NCAA tournament appearances, St. John's has made appearances in 2 Final Fours and 10 Sweet Sixteens.

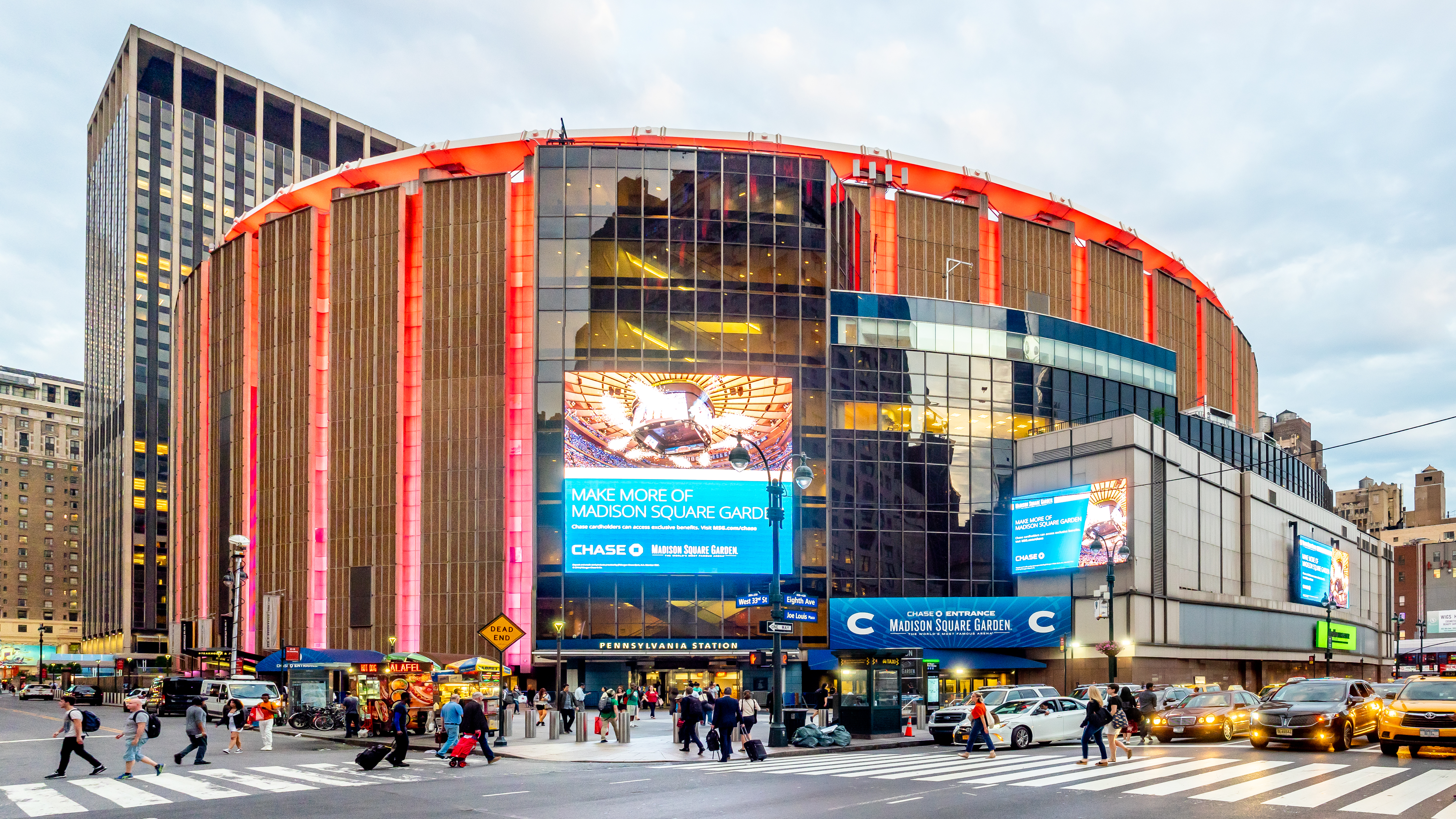
Madison Square Garden (MSG) – Home Court for St. John's Basketball

The Red Storm play most of their home games at Madison Square Garden, "The World's Most Famous Arena", while their early non-conference games are held at Carnesecca Arena on the St. John's campus in Queens. St. John's University holds the second best winning percentage for a New York City school in the NCAA basketball tournament (second to City College of New York – which won one NCAA Div 1 Championships as the CCNY Beavers men's basketball) St. John's has the most NIT appearances with 27, the most championship wins with 6, although they were stripped of one due to an NCAA infraction. In 2008, St. John's celebrated its 100th year of college basketball.

=== Fencing ===
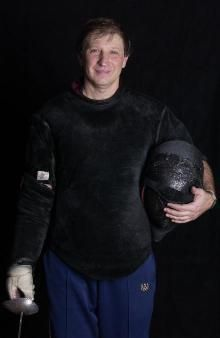
Yury Gelman

The St. John's fencing program, coached for three decades (since 1995) by Olympic coach Yury Gelman, has also attained national prominence including Olympians Keeth Smart and (later banned for life) Ivan Lee. In 2001, St. John's won the NCAA fencing championship. The men's team has ranked in the top seven in each of the last 30 years, and finished 2nd in the NCAAin the 1995, 2000, 2002, 2007, and 2010 seasons. In addition to team accolades, St. John's fencers have won 26 NCAA Individual National Championship titles, and 140 have been named All-Americans.

St. John's alumnus Daryl Homer and alumna Dagmara Wozniak were both named to the 2016 U.S. Olympic fencing team, the second time that each was selected. In 2021 Canadian Eli Schenkel fenced in the Olympics.

=== Men's soccer ===
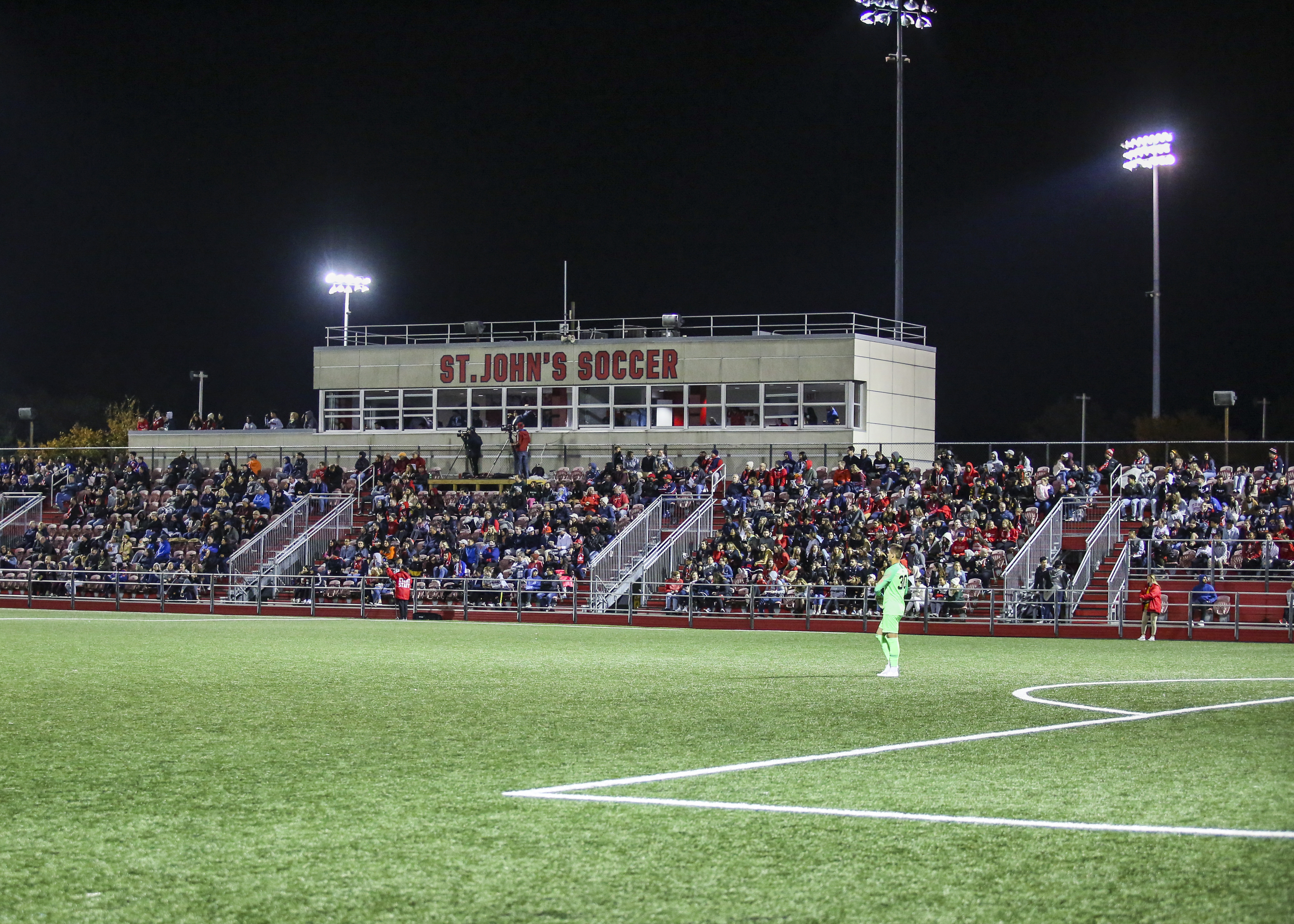
A view inside Belson Stadium, the home of the St. John's men's and women's soccer teams on the Queens Campus

The St. John's men's soccer program has appeared in 15 consecutive NCAA tournaments, advancing to the Sweet 16 in each of the last ten seasons, and the Final Four on 3 occasions. They have captured 11 Big East Championships, including the 2006 season title as well as the 2009 season title, and in 1996, St. John's won the NCAA National Championship. Their home games are hosted at Belson Stadium, a state-of-the-art 2,300-seat stadium on the university campus. In 2006, the men's soccer team became the first American soccer team to be invited to play in Vietnam. The team played against several Vietnam Football Federation squads as well as participating in community service.

=== Women's athletics ===
The women's programs at St. John's University have also enjoyed a tremendous amount of success. The women's volleyball, soccer, tennis, basketball & softball teams have combined to win 9 Big East Championships and appear in 17 NCAA tournaments since the 1980s.

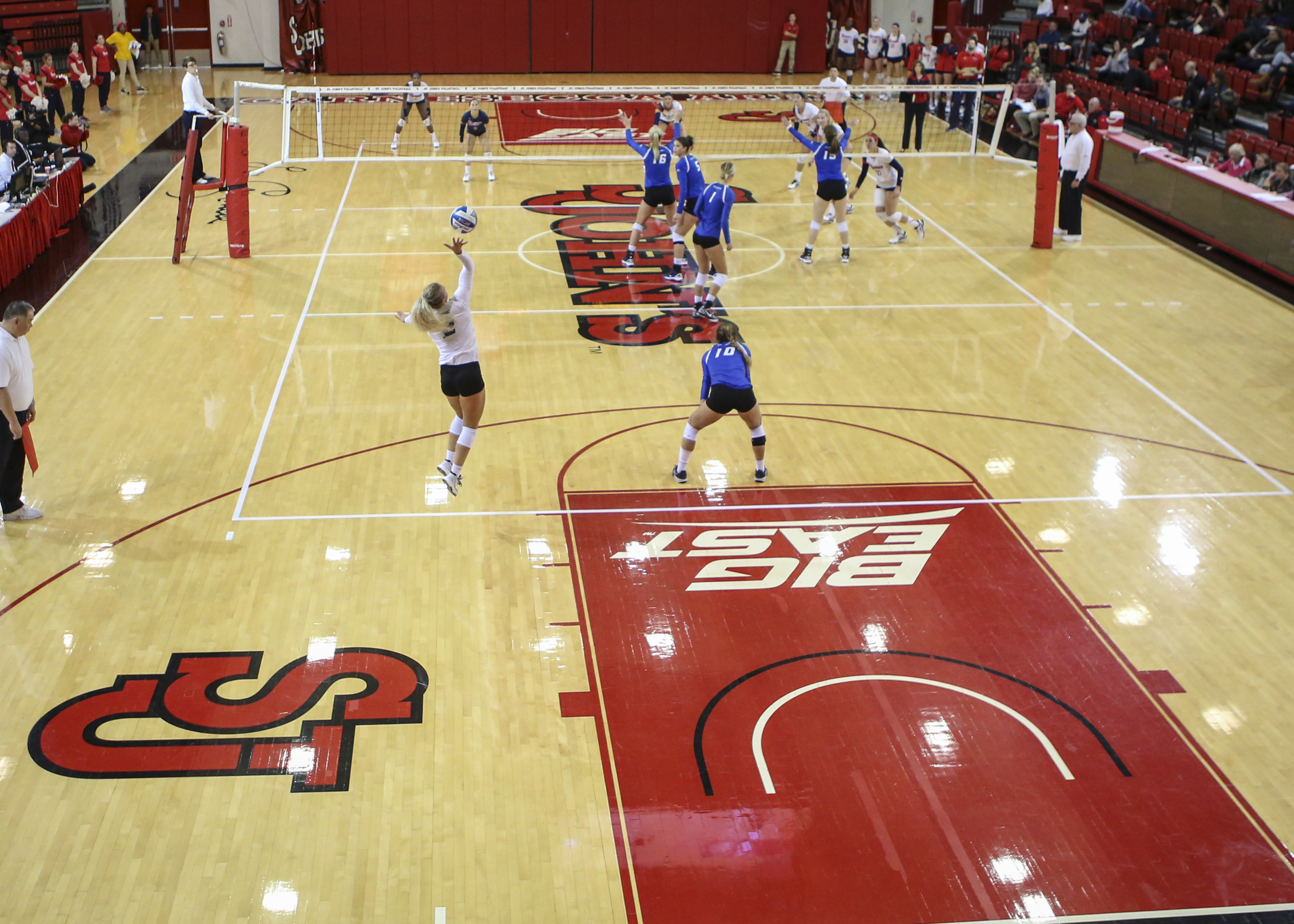
The St. John's Red Storm volleyball team hosting a match at Carnesecca Arena

- Volleyball – the women's volleyball team at St. John's have won 3 Big East regular-season championships (2006, 2007 & 2008) and won the Big East Championship in 2007 and 2019 – and appeared in the Women's Volleyball NCAA tournament in 2006, 2007 and 2019.
- Basketball – along with the St. John's fencing program, the women's basketball program at St. John's has been one of the most successful women's programs at the university. The Red Storm women's program are 4 time Big East Champions (1983, 1984, 1988 & 2016) and have appeared in 10 NCAA women's basketball tournaments, including 7 appearances since 2006. On February 18, 2012, the St. John's women's team defeated perennial national power the UConn Lady Huskies 57–56, in Connecticut, to end the Lady Huskies 99 game home court winning streak.
- Soccer – the women's soccer program at St. John's won the 1994 Big East Championship and appeared in the NCAA Women's Soccer Tournament in 2009 and 2013.
- Softball – the 2015 campaign for the St. John's softball team was a historic one for the program. The Red Storm softball team won their first ever Big East Championship in 2015 and appeared in the 2015 NCAA softball tournament for the first time in program history.

=== Controversies ===
- In the early 1960s, in one of the biggest point-shaving scandals in the school's history, three St. John's athletes were accused of having taken bribes. (See Also: 1961 NCAA University Division men's basketball gambling scandal)
- The 1990 lacrosse team rape case involved five members of the St. John's University lacrosse team who were acquitted of charges. One student pleaded guilty to second degree sexual abuse. Another member pleaded guilty to sexual assault and a third to two counts of sexual misconduct and unlawful imprisonment.
- In 2000, St. John's was criticized by the NCAA for misrepresenting facts in an NCAA investigation.
- In 2003, it was revealed that Abe Keita, a basketball player, was given a $300 monthly allowance and free school books to be on the team, which violated NCAA standards. Expecting NCAA penalties, the university announced a self-imposed two-year ban on postseason play.

=== Rivalries ===
- Seton Hall University
- Georgetown University
- University of Connecticut
- Syracuse University
- Villanova University

== Notable alumni ==
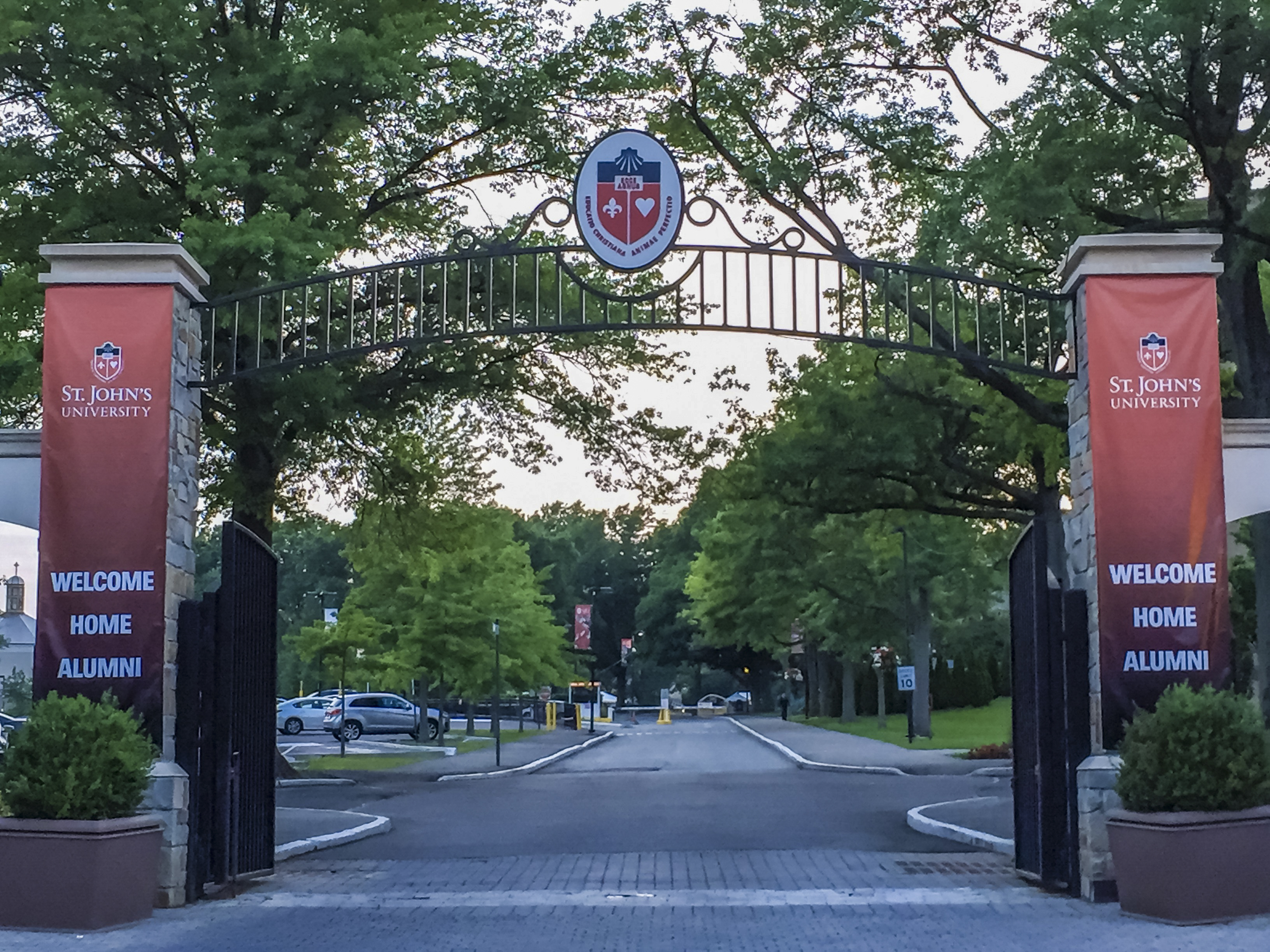
The main entrance on the Queens Campus displaying a welcome sign for alumni arriving for the university's annual Grand Alumni Homecoming Weekend

St. John's has more than 200,000 living alumni. Notable alumni include:

- Anthony Bevilacqua, cardinal and Archbishop of Philadelphia.
- Hugh Carey, 51st Governor of New York (1975–1982).
- J. Cole, Grammy‑winning rapper and record producer.
- Mario Cuomo, 52nd Governor of New York (1983–1994).
- Raymond J. Dearie, senior United States district judge of the United States District Court for the Eastern District of New York.
- George Deukmejian, 35th Governor of California (1983–1991).
- Janet DiFiore, Chief Judge of the New York Court of Appeals (2016–2022).
- Chris Mullin, five‑time NBA All‑Star and member of the Naismith Memorial Basketball Hall of Fame.
- Bob Sheppard, long‑time public‑address announcer for the New York Yankees and the New York Giants.
- Guy Velella, New York State Senator indicted for bribery and conspiracy. He pleaded guilty to one count in a plea bargain and received a year in jail, but served 182 days.
- Sal Vulcano, comedian and actor, member of the comedy troupe The Tenderloins and star of Impractical Jokers.
