= Conrado Gempesaw =

17th President of St. John's University
- In office July 2014 – February 2021
- Preceded by: Joseph L. Levesque
- Succeeded by: Brian Shanley

Personal details
- Born: Philippines
- Education: Ateneo de Davao University (BA); West Virginia University (MS); Pennsylvania State University (PhD)

Conrado "Bobby" Gempesaw is an academic administrator who served as the 17th president of St. John's University in New York City. He is the first layperson to hold the position since the university's establishment in 1870, as all 16 prior presidents were Vincentian priests.

== Early life and education ==
Gempesaw is a native of the Philippines and immigrated to the U.S. in 1980 after earning his Bachelor of Arts degree in Economics from Ateneo de Davao University. After settling in the United States, he earned a Master of Science in Agricultural Economics from West Virginia University and a Ph.D in Agricultural Economics from Pennsylvania State University.

== Career ==
Gempesaw is the second Filipino-American to serve as a college president of a doctoral research university in the United States. Prior to his role as president, he served as Provost and Executive Vice President for Academic Affairs at Miami University in Oxford, Ohio. He also served as dean and tenured professor at the Alfred Lerner College of Business and Economics at The University of Delaware.

Gempesaw took office as President of St. John's University in July 2014, succeeding interim president Joseph L. Levesque.

On September 1, 2019, Gempesaw began a three-year term on the NCAA Division I Presidential Forum, the governing board of the NCAA Division I intercollegiate athletic conference.

On June 10, 2020, Gempesaw announced his retirement from academia and will step down as President of the University in early 2021. On November 24, 2020 the board of trustees announced that former President of Providence College, Brian Shanley will become the next President and will start his tenure at the University on February 1, 2021.

== Personal life ==
Gempesaw is married to Clavel Albay Gempesaw, an academic who attended the University of Delaware. They have two adult sons.
