= Brian Shanley =

American academic priest

The Reverend Brian Shanley OP

18th President of St. John's University
- Incumbent
- Assumed office February 2021
- Preceded by: Conrado Gempesaw

Personal details
- Born: July 7, 1958 (age 68) Warwick, Rhode Island, U.S.
- Education: Providence College (BS); Catholic University of America (PhL); Dominican House of Studies (MDiv, STL); University of Toronto (PhD); University of Notre Dame

Brian J. Shanley, OP (born July 7, 1958), is an American Catholic priest of the Order of Preachers who has served as the 18th president of St. John's University in New York since 2021. Previously, he was president of Providence College from 2005 to 2020.

== Biography ==
Shanley was born in Warwick, Rhode Island, on July 7, 1958. After completing undergraduate studies in history at Providence College in 1980, he earned a licentiate degree in philosophy from The Catholic University of America (CUA) in 1984. He also earned a Master of Divinity in 1986 and a licentiate degree in sacred theology in 1988 from the Dominican House of Studies in Washington, D.C. Shanley was ordained to the priesthood as a member of the Dominican Order of Preachers in 1987.

Shanley served as an instructor in philosophy at Providence from 1988 to 1991. He earned a doctorate in philosophy from the University of Toronto in 1994 and completed a post-doctoral fellowship at the University of Notre Dame's Center for Philosophy of Religion. He served as a philosophy professor at CUA from 1994 to 2005 was a visiting professor at Emory University's Candler School of Theology in Fall 2002.

In 1999, Shanley was named to the Board of Trustees of Providence College. He previously served as both an associate editor and editor of The Thomist and as a member of the editorial board for the International Journal for Philosophy of Religion. His research interests include Thomas Aquinas, philosophy of religion, metaphysics, medieval philosophy, and ethics. He was also a member of the executive committee of the American Catholic Philosophical Association.

=== President of Providence College (2005–2020) ===
Shanley was hired as president of Providence College in 2005. He also served as regent of studies for the Dominican Province of St. Joseph, during which time he held a seat on the provincial council, a body of 12 Dominican friars serving as cabinet-level advisors to the prior provincial. He advised the prior provincial on all matters pertaining to the intellectual and academic life of the province.

On March 29, 2019, Shanley announced that, while the Providence board of trustees had recommended that he serve another 5-year term as president, his prior provincial would not make him available to do so. He accepted his superior's decision and concluded his service as president at the end of his third term on June 30, 2020.

=== President of St. John's University (2021–present) ===
Shanley became president of St. John's University in New York in February 2021.

In February 2026, he announced that St. John's would no longer recognize its faculty union, which has existed since 1970.

== Personal life ==
Shanley is an opera aficionado, enjoys golf, and practices xingyiquan martial arts.
