= Nelson Baker =

Union Army soldier, later priest, venerable (1842–1936)

Venerable Nelson Henry Baker
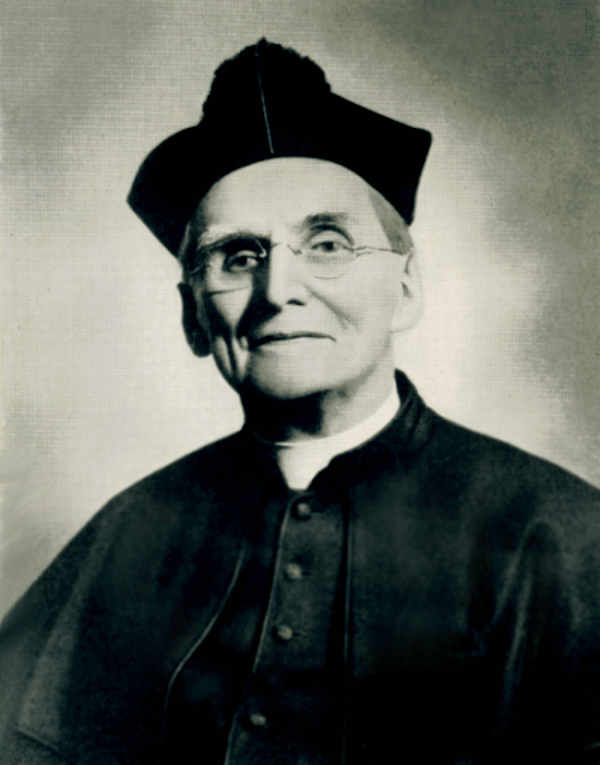
- Born: February 16, 1842; Buffalo, New York, United States
- Died: July 29, 1936 (aged 94); Lackawanna, New York, United States

Nelson Henry Baker (February 16, 1842 – July 29, 1936) was an American Catholic monsignor in Lackawanna, New York, whom the Vatican has declared as venerable.

Starting out in a parish deeply in debt, Nelson developed a national fundraising campaign that allowed him to build social institutions over the next 54 years that benefited the entire Western New York Region. He expanded and upgraded an existing orphanage and reform school. He created a home for abandoned infants and unwed mothers, a maternity hospital and two schools, among other facilities. During the Great Depression, he provided food, shelter and clothing to the needy of all religious faiths.

For his work with the disadvantaged and the outcasts of society, Baker was given the name "Padre of the Poor". A devotee of Mary, mother of Jesus, he constructed the Our Lady of Victory Basilica in Lackawanna. Since 1986, the Diocese of Buffalo has worked to secure Baker's canonization. He was declared venerable in 2011 by Pope Benedict XVI.

== History ==
=== Early life ===
Nelson Baker was born in Buffalo, New York, on February 16, 1842, to Lewis Becker (later Baker) and Caroline Donnellan. Nelson Baker was the second eldest of four sons. Lewis Becker, a German Evangelical Lutheran, was a retired mariner who opened a grocery store on Batavia Street in Buffalo. Nelson's mother, Caroline, was a devout Irish Catholic.

Nelson Baker was baptised a Lutheran as an infant. However, under his mother's influence, he was re-baptized a Catholic in 1851 and raised a Catholic. After graduating high school, Nelson Baker worked in the family store. Lewis Baker was said to have instilled an astute business sense in his son.

=== Soldier and businessman ===
In early July 1863, during the American Civil War, Baker entered the 74th regiment of the New York State Militia at age 21 for a 30-day enlistment. The regiment immediately departed for southern Pennsylvania, where it participated in the three day Battle of Gettysburg. After the battle, the 74th was dispatched to quell the New York City draft riots.

After being discharged from the militia, in August 1863, Baker started a successful feed and grain business in Buffalo with his friend and fellow veteran, Joseph Meyer. Baker began to exhibit a strong interest in Catholicism and joined the Vincent DePaul Society. He began taking Latin classes at St. Michael's residence in Buffalo at night.

=== Seminary ===
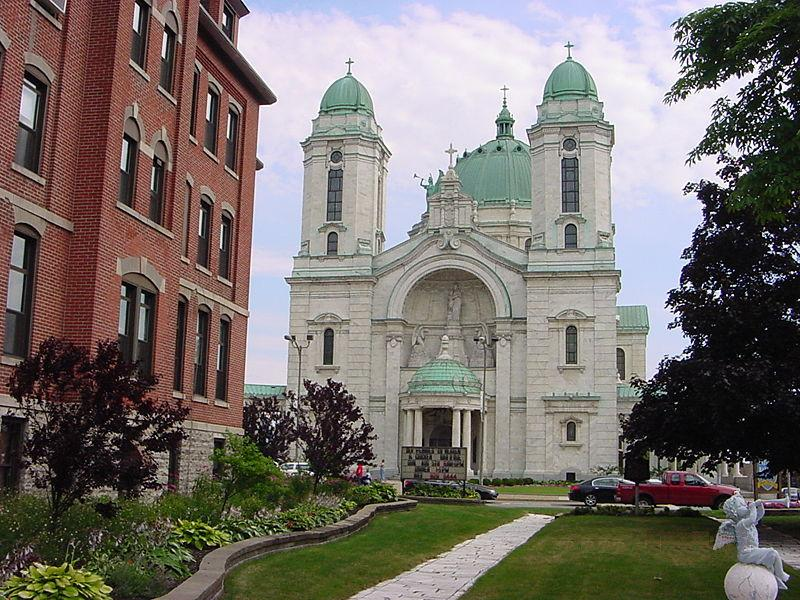
Our Lady of Victory Basilica, Lackawanna, New York

In the summer of 1869, needing a vacation from work, Baker took a steamship trip along Lake Erie, using the time to think about his future. At stops along the way, he attended masses at local parishes. By the time Baker returned to Buffalo, he had decided to enter the priesthood. Caroline Baker was delighted with the news, but Lewis Baker and Meyer had reservations about his decision.

Baker entered Our Lady of Angels Seminary in Lewiston, New York, on September 2, 1869. In 1871, his studies were interrupted for 18 weeks with a hospitalization for erysipelas. During his stay, doctors lanced 11 areas of cellulitis on his legs. After his recovery and return to the seminary, Baker was appointed head of its chapter of the Vincent de Paul Society.

Baker in 1874 joined a group of seminarians on a pilgrimage to Rome. They wanted to support the restoration to the Vatican of the Papal States, which four years earlier had been seized by the Kingdom of Italy. While stopping in Paris, France, the seminarians toured the Basilica of Notre-Dame-des-Victoires. Several biographers of Baker note that this visit to the basilica initiated Baker's lifelong devotion to Our Lady of Victory, a title of Mary, mother of Jesus. After the seminarians arrived in Rome, they toured St. Peter's Basilica and other religious sites; Pope Pius IX granted them a brief audience at the Vatican.

=== Priesthood ===
Baker was ordained into the priesthood on March 19, 1876, by Bishop Stephen V. Ryan for the Diocese of Buffalo at St. Joseph's Cathedral in Buffalo. He returned to Our Lady of the Angels in Lewiston the next day, to celebrate his first mass. After his ordination, the diocese assigned Baker as an assistant pastor to Reverend Thomas Hines at St. Patrick's Parish in Limestone Hill, New York. The parish included St. Joseph's Orphanage, run by the Sisters of St. Joseph since 1857, and St. John's Protectory, a diocesan reform school for boys.

When Baker arrived at St. Patrick's, the orphanage and protectory were already $21,000 in debt. By 1881, that figure had risen to $60,000. Frustrated by Hines' unwillingness to deal with the financial problems, Baker requested a transfer from the diocese to another parish. They sent him that year to serve as an assistant pastor at St. Mary's Parish in Corning, New York.

In 1882, after Hines' retirement, the diocese sent Baker back to St. Patrick to serve as superintendent of the protectory and the orphanage. It was thought that his business experience would help rescue the two institutions.

=== Our Lady of Victory Institutions ===
==== 1882 to 1900 ====
Several days after returning to St. Patrick in 1882, a group of creditors met with Baker, demanding immediate payment of the orphanage and protectory debts. Baker persuaded them to accept a partial payment upfront followed by a repayment plan. Baker used all of his personal fortune for the partial payment.

On taking control of the protectory, Baker removed all the bars from the windows and remodeled the building to establish a more homelike atmosphere. His philosophy was that there was no such thing as a bad boy.

To repay the debt load, Baker founded the Association of Our Lady of Victory." Working at night, he wrote to postmasters across the country, asking for mailing lists of the Catholic women in their areas. He then sent solicitations to these women, asking for donations for the orphanage and protectory. The women could join the Association for a donation of 25 cents a year. The charitable institutions in St. Patrick Parish soon became known as the Our Lady of Victory (OLV) Institutions

In 1888, Baker started a journal, The Annals of the Association of Our Lady of Victory, that he sent to Association members to solicit donations. By 1889, Baker had eliminated the parish debt. In 1891, Baker hired a drilling company to explore for natural gas on OLV property, with hopes of offsetting heating costs for its institutions. According to local accounts, Baker buried a small statue of Our Lady of Victory in the ground and told the drillers to drill there. After several weeks of drilling without results, they finally hit gas at over 1,300 feet deep, a very deep spot for natural gas.

Having more revenue from his fundraising, Baker in 1893 expanded the protectory and in 1895 added a gym, a recreational hall, and a new high school.

==== 1900 to 1936 ====
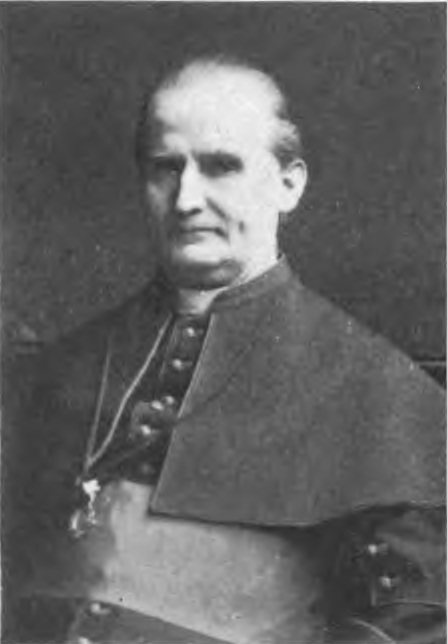
Monsignor Nelson Baker (1914)

By 1901, the number of boys at the protectory had tripled to 385. At the orphanage, the total number of children doubled to 236. Bishop Charles H. Colton named Baker as vicar general of the diocese in 1904. During this time, Baker heard stories about infant remains being discovered in the local waterways. This prompted Baker in 1908 to found the OLV Infant Home for unwed mothers and abandoned infants. Baker kept a crib and a blanket outside the Infant Home for any mother who wanted to leave a child there during the night.

In 1916, a fire caused severe damage at St. Patrick Church, making its long term use unfeasible. In 1919, Baker opened Our Lady of Victory Maternity Hospital in Lackawanna. Baker by 1920 was ready to start construction of a replacement church for St. Patrick, a shrine to Our Lady of Victory. The Vatican in 1923 named Baker as a protonotary apostolic with the title of monsignor, an honor held by only five other priests in the United States at that time. In 1926, Our Lady of Victory Shrine was dedicated. Later that year, the pope named it as a minor basilica, the second one in the United States.

With the beginning of the Great Depression in 1929, the OLV institutions started providing 450,000 meals to the hungry as well as shelters for the homeless. Boys staying at the institutions produced shoes and clothing for the poor. Baker also provided spiritual counseling for many non-Catholics visiting the OLV institutions in what became known as the Black Apostolate. By 1935, over 700 individuals had been baptised as Catholics under the apostolate.

In early 1936, Baker's health started to deteriorate. Nelson Baker lapsed into a coma and died on July 29, 1936, in Lackawanna at age 94.

== Veneration ==
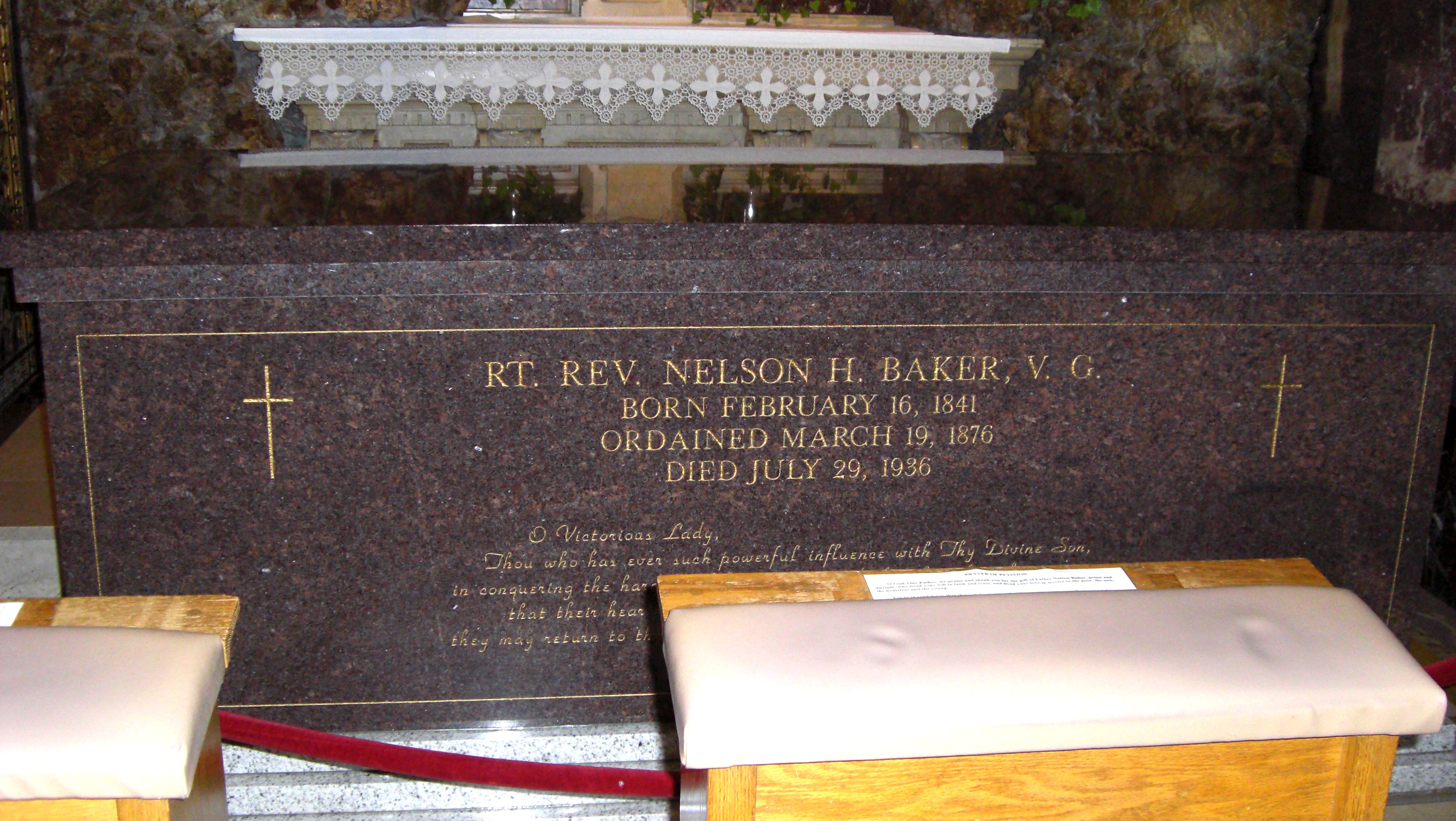
The sarcophagus containing the remains of Reverend Baker

In 1987, Pope John Paul II named Baker as a servant of God. The diocese moved his remains from Holy Cross Cemetery in Lackawanna in 1999 and reinterred them under the Our Lady of Lourdes altar in the Our Lady of Victory Basilica.

On January 14, 2011, Pope Benedict XVI authorized the Congregation for the Causes of Saints in Rome to issue a decree recognizing Baker's heroic virtue and designating him as venerable.

== Legacy ==
In 1956, OLV closed St. John's Protectory and moved its clients into Baker Hall, a set of cottages, that was named after Nelson Baker. In Lackawanna, the Father Baker Bridge over New York State Route 5 was named for Nelson Baker as well as the Father Baker Boulevard in that city The Father Baker Museum, located in the basement of the Our Lady of Victory Basilica, was originally opened in 1941 as the "Father Baker Memorial Rooms" and offered a replica of Father Baker's sitting room and bedroom. It has since been renovated several times.

== See also ==
- American Catholic Servants of God, Venerables, Beatified, and Saints
- Our Lady of Victory Basilica
