= Our Lady of Victory Basilica (Lackawanna, New York) =

Catholic parish and national shrine in Lackawanna, New York

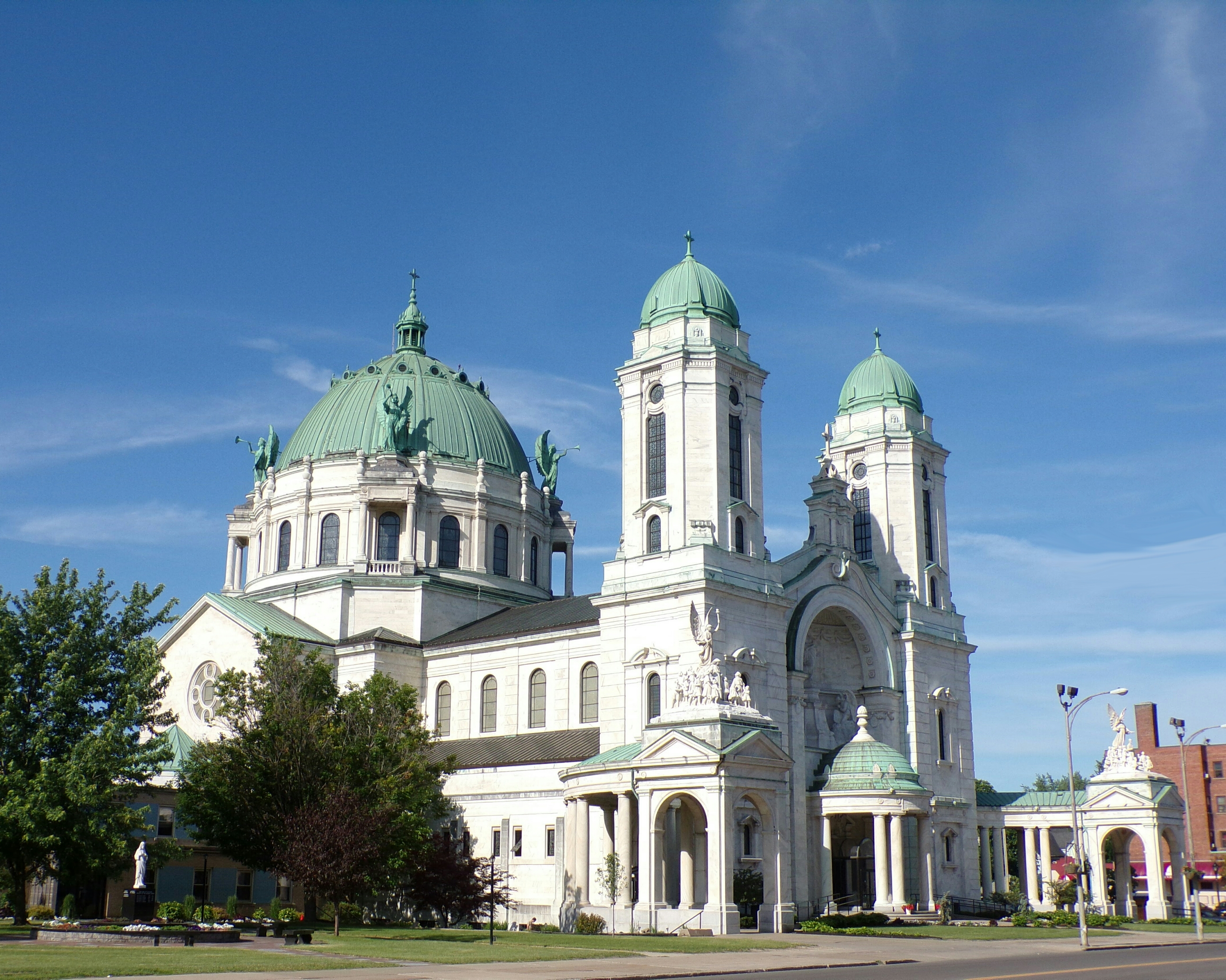
- The front exterior of Our Lady of Victory Basilica.

Religion
- Affiliation: Catholic
- Diocese: Diocese of Buffalo
- Ecclesiastical or organisational status: Minor Basilica, National Shrine
- Leadership: Bishop: Michael W. Fisher; Pastor: Reverend Monsignor David G. LiPuma
- Year consecrated: 1926

Location
- Location: 767 Ridge Road; Lackawanna, New York, United States
- Interactive map of Our Lady of Victory Basilica
- Coordinates: 42°49′33″N 78°49′25″W

Architecture
- Architect: Emile Ulrich
- Type: Basilica
- Groundbreaking: 1921
- Completed: 1926

Specifications
- Direction of façade: North
- Capacity: 1,200 sitting
- Dome height (outer): 165 feet (50 m)
- Dome height (inner): 120 feet (37 m)
- Dome dia. (inner): 80 feet (24 m)
- Spire: 2
- Materials: Marble

Website
- www.ourladyofvictory.org

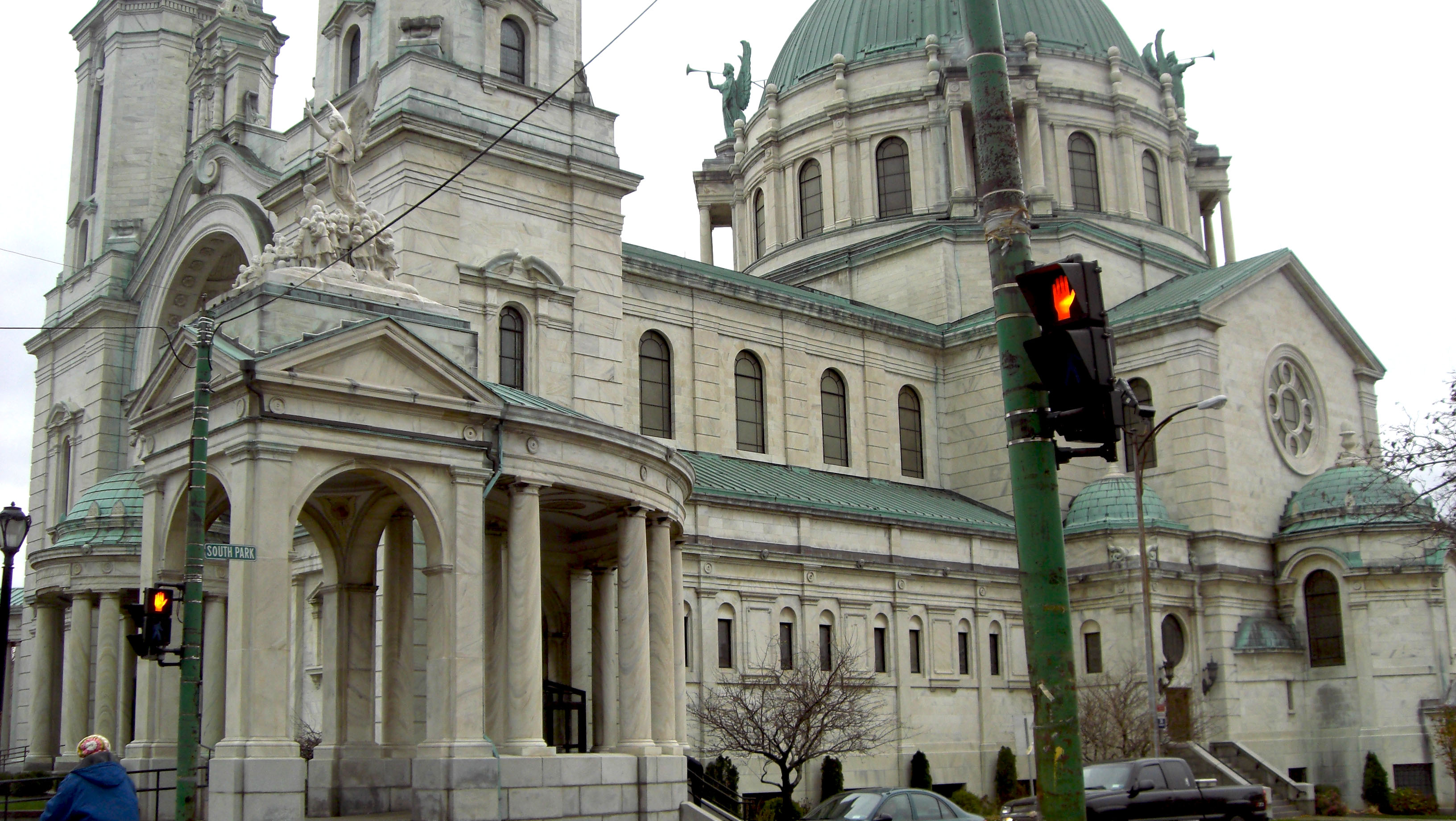
View of the side exterior of Our Lady of Victory Basilica.

The Our Lady of Victory Basilica is a Catholic parish church and national shrine in Lackawanna, New York which was consecrated in 1926. Due to the multiple charities of founder Nelson Baker, the shrine is a popular pilgrimage and visitor destination in Lackawanna. It is part of the Diocese of Buffalo.

== History ==
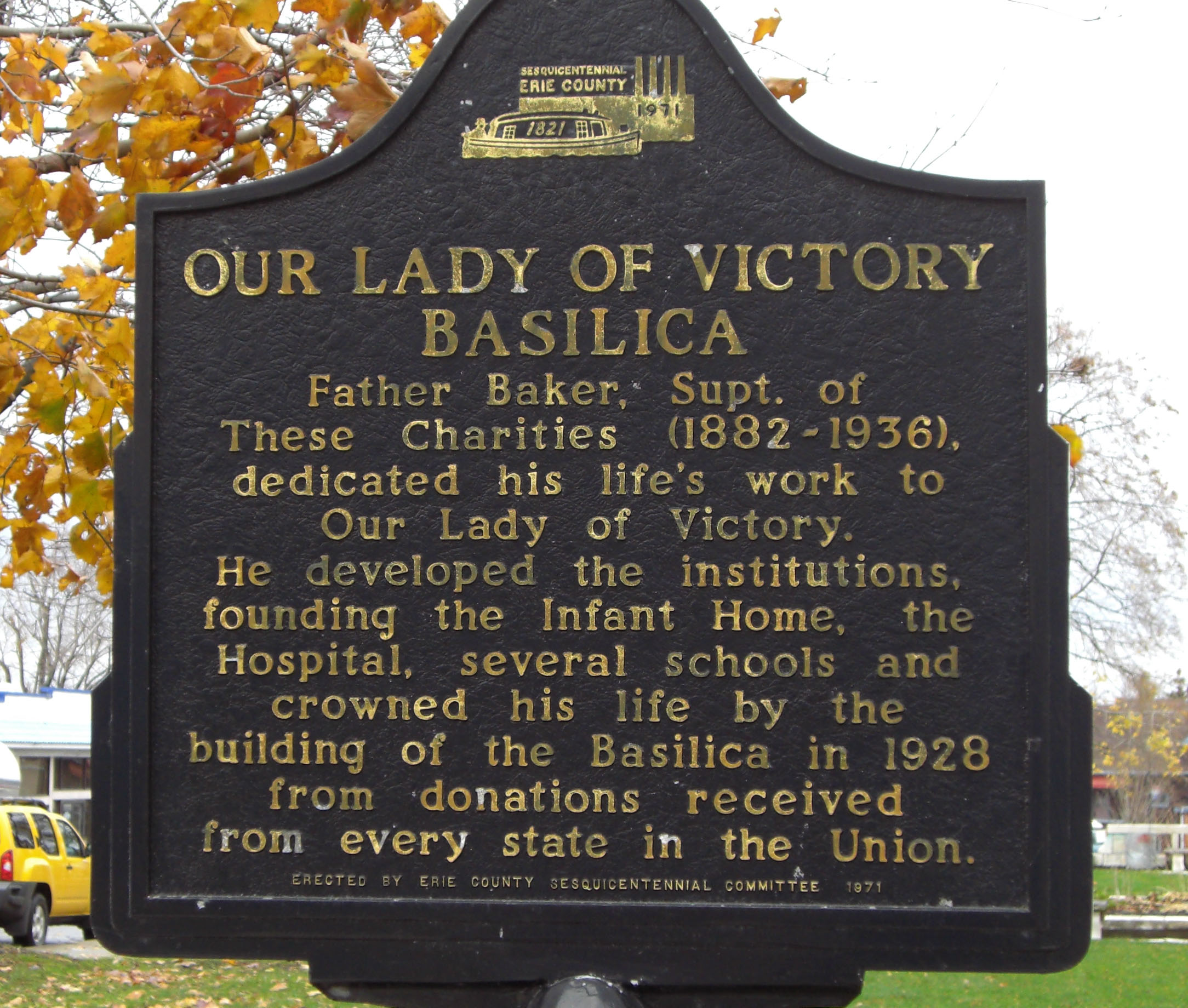
A sign describing the basilica's important status amongst Father Nelson Baker's several charitable institutions of Our Lady of Victory parish.

In 1916, fire seriously damaged St. Patrick's Parish Church in Lackawanna, New York. Repairs were undertaken, but the superintendent priest of the busy parish, Father Nelson Baker, developed plans to replace the church. On May 7, 1921, Father Baker celebrated the last Mass at St. Patrick's and the structure was immediately dismantled to make way for something larger.

Construction of the new basilica began in 1921 after Father Baker unveiled plans at a parish council meeting to build a shrine in homage to the Blessed Mother. Because of Baker's influence in the community and his well-known charitable reputation across the nation, he was able to secure sufficient financial support to begin construction quickly. Baker solicited support for his project, and thousands from across the nation contributed funding both large and small, mostly through a direct-mail fundraising club. Designed by Emile Ulrich, the basilica was constructed at a cost of $3.2 million, but the project was completed without the parish incurring any debt.

By late 1925, construction on the sanctuary of Our Lady of Victory was complete, and the first Mass was held there on Christmas of that year. On May 25, 1926, a consecration ceremony took place presided over by Father Baker, Bishop William Turner of the Diocese of Buffalo, and Cardinal Patrick Hayes. Thousands of priests, religious sisters, and believers from across the nation attended the event. Two months later, Pope Pius XI designated the shrine with the title of "Minor Basilica" via an apostolic decree. Baker was in charge of the basilica and the parish's various institutions of charity until his death on July 29, 1936.

The basilica has had only two significant changes to its original design. The first came in 1941 during a violent lightning storm that caused significant damage to the basilica's twin towers.

Baker's first successor, Monsignor Joseph Maguire, took charge of the efforts to refurbish the structures. He had the marble towers replaced with the lower, enclosed, copper dome-tipped towers that still top the basilica today. Following the harsh winter of 2001–2002, the roof of the National Shrine was found to have significantly deteriorated. Its copper had turned a greenish hue due to overexposure to the elements (a similar chemical effect as seen on the Statue of Liberty) and was no longer weather tight. A new copper roof was installed.

In 2001, a celebration of the National Shrine's Diamond Jubilee and Basilica's 75 years in the making was held at the Our Lady of Victory Parish. On May 26, a special Mass was followed by a dinner party, at which hundreds of dignitaries, clergy members, and friends came together to celebrate the basilica and Father Baker's legacy.

The basilica complex was listed on the National Register of Historic Places in 2024.

== Relics of Father Baker ==
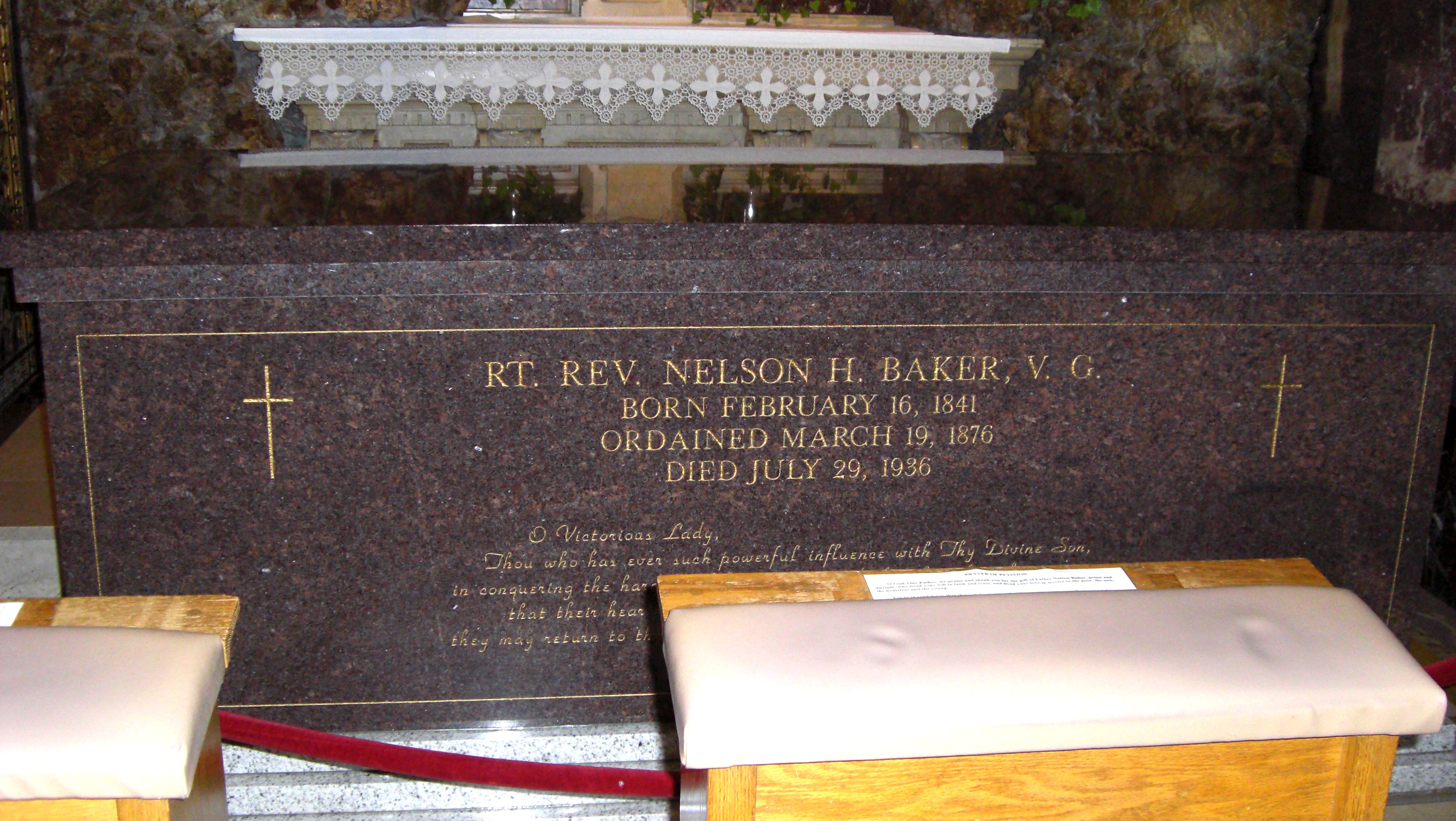
The sarcophagus containing the remains of Father Nelson Baker.

In July 1998, through the efforts of Bishop Henry J. Mansell, it was announced that the remains of Father Baker would be relocated from nearby Holy Cross Cemetery and reinterred in the basilica. The move was ordered by the Congregation for the Causes of Saints in Rome, to signify a step toward declaring Baker a saint.

On March 11, 1999, Father Baker's casket was carried by six men who were raised by Baker, and placed in a sarcophagus within the Grotto Shrine to Our Lady of Lourdes, found on the southern end of the basilica's transept. It is estimated that nearly 6,000 people attended the event at the basilica that day to honor Baker and his work. The re-interment helped raise awareness of Baker, his mission, and his legacy across the world. On January 14, 2011, Pope Benedict XVI declared Fr. Baker "venerable".

== Architecture ==
=== Exterior ===
The design of the exterior of the basilica was the work of French ecclesiastical architect Emile Ulrich. To fulfill Father Baker's wish for the finest materials and workmanship, Ulrich halted all other projects from his architectural firm in Cleveland and spent his time personally inspecting artists' work both in the United States and Europe.

The majority of the exterior of the shrine is constructed almost entirely of pure white marble, supplied by the Georgia Marble Company of Tate, Georgia. Throughout the basilica's interior and parts of the exterior, a combination of more than 40 different types, colors, and designs of Italian marble can also be found.

==== Great dome ====
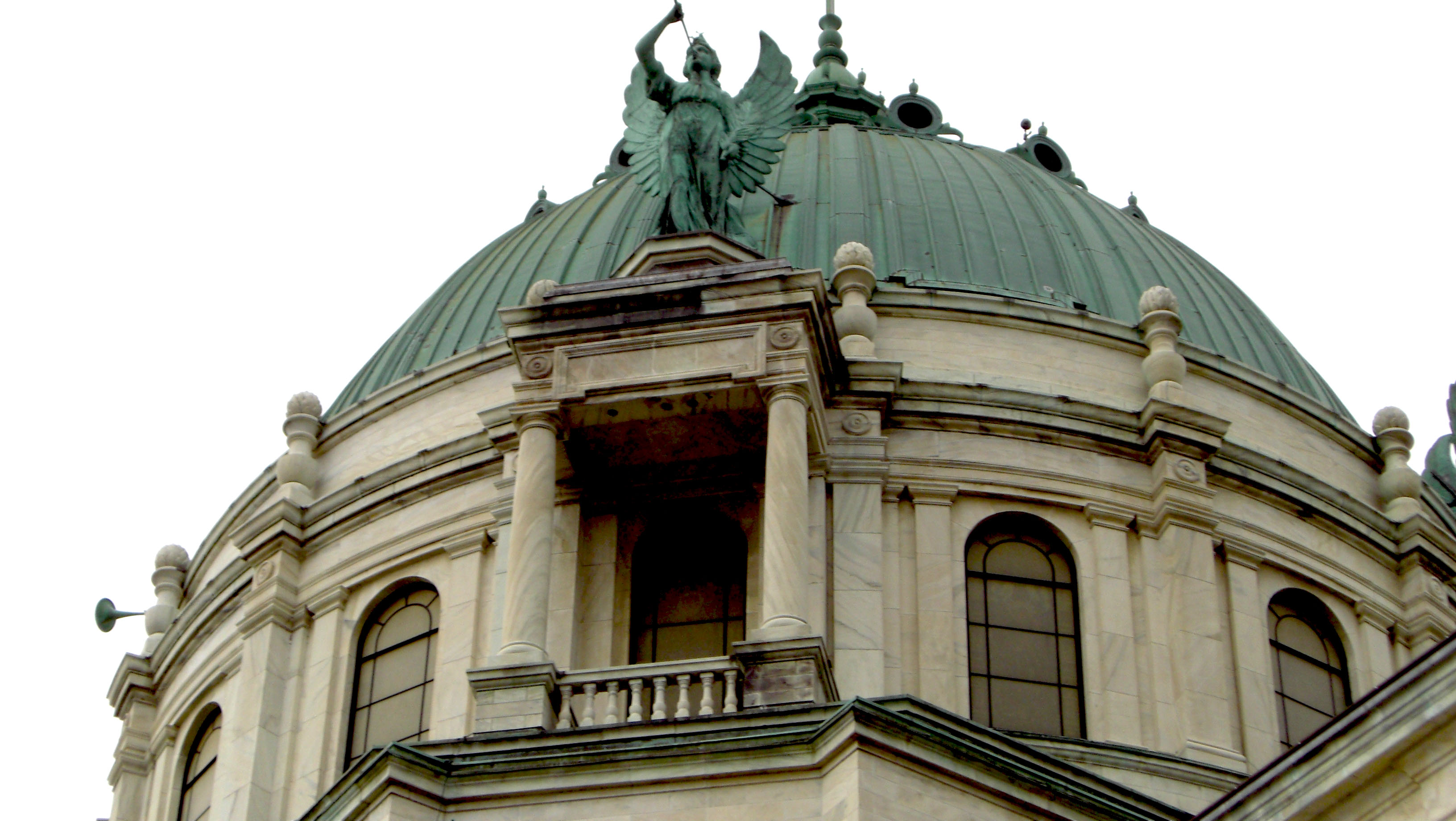
A closeup of the exterior of the Great Dome.

A prominent feature of the basilica's exterior is the large copper dome. The dome, measuring 165 feet in height, was second in size only to the U.S. Capitol building in Washington, D.C. at the time of its completion in 1926. Over the years, the dome's original copper has aged to a green patina, as expected. Four copper angel statues playing trumpets, measuring 18 feet tall, are mounted on the dome.

==== Twin towers ====
The original twin towers of the basilica, when completed in 1926, stood at a height of 165 feet (about 16 stories). The spires were made completely of marble and had an open design. In 1941, a violent lightning storm caused major damage to both the towers, forcing redesign and refurbishing. The new towers, enclosed and much shorter than the originals, are topped with copper domes, similar to the design of the basilica's Great Dome.

==== Main entrance ====
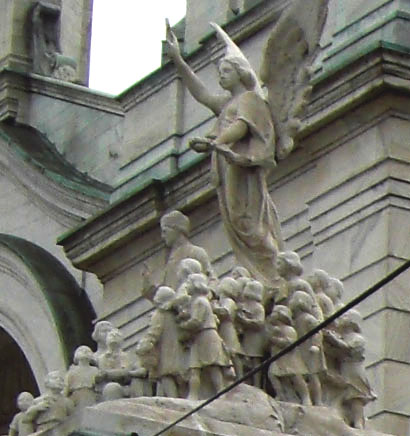
The colonnade that features the figure of Father Baker on the side exterior of the basilica.

Two large colonnades extend outward and flank the exterior sides of the shrine at the main entrance. On top of each is a marble sculpture of a group of children overseen by a large angel. On the left colonnade (when facing the basilica's front), the children are led by a religious sister. This figure represents the Sisters of St. Joseph, the order which has staffed the Our Lady of Victory Institutions since 1856. On the right colonnade, the children are led by a priest, Father Baker. This figure of Baker was ordered by Ulrich to honor the priest for his several contributions to the Our Lady of Victory Institutions. Also at the entrance to the basilica is a domed niche that houses a 12-foot-tall, 16,000-pound (eight tons) statue of Our Lady of Victory, crafted of the finest Carrara marble available.

=== Interior ===
==== The great dome and ceiling ====
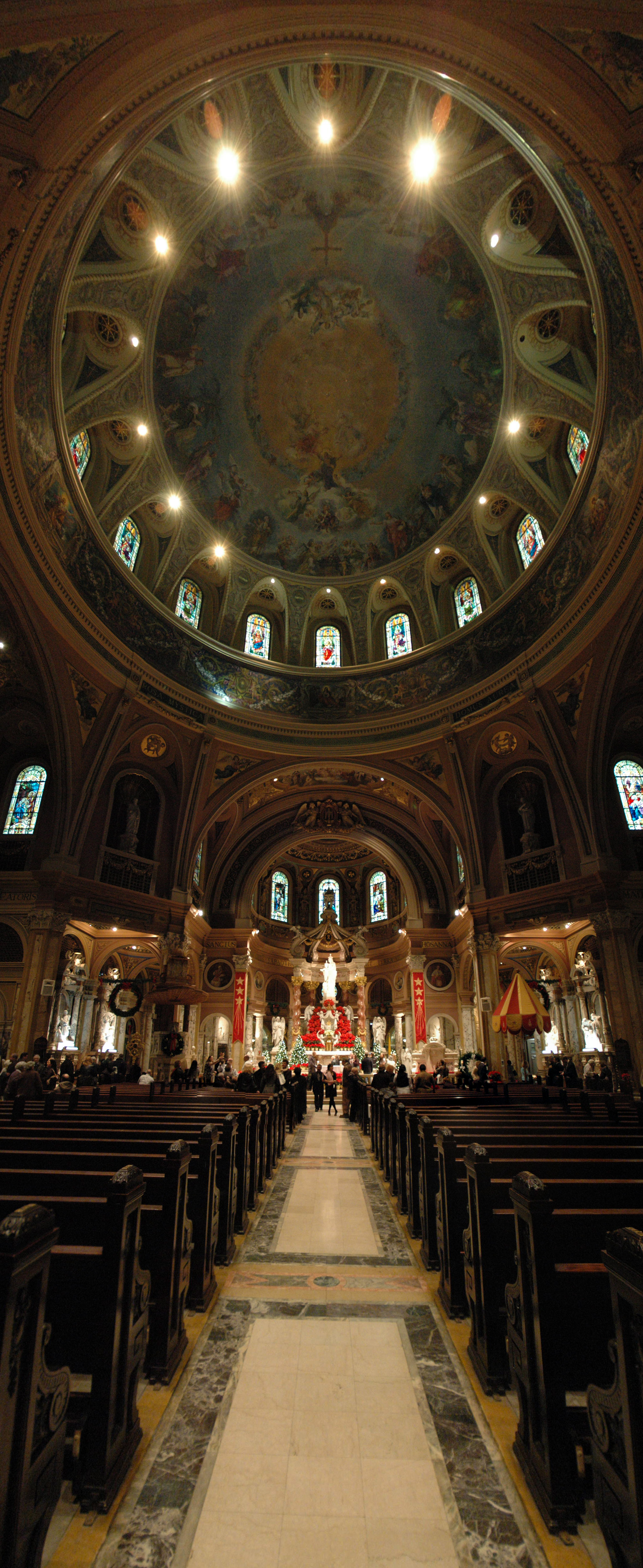
Interior of Our Lady of Victory Basilica.

The largest work of art is the decoration of the Great Dome, 80 feet (24 m) in diameter, which depicts the Assumption of Mary and the Blessed Mother's Coronation. Around the dome's outer edge, the 12 apostles and three archangels are shown, while an angelic host carries Mary towards heaven. Slightly higher within the dome, Jesus in red robes can be seen awaiting her. At the pinnacle of the dome, 120 feet (37 m) above the basilica floor, a white Dove of Peace looks down from Heaven at the basilica.

From the Great Dome to the choir loft, the ceiling is covered by five giant murals. They depict Mary as Queen of Patriarchs, Queen of the Apostles, Queen of the Angels, Queen of the Prophets, and Queen of the Martyrs. The two walls on the basilica's sides feature huge paintings depicting scenes from the Gospels: the Massacre of the Innocents, the Flight into Egypt, and the Birth of Jesus at Bethlehem.

==== The main altar ====
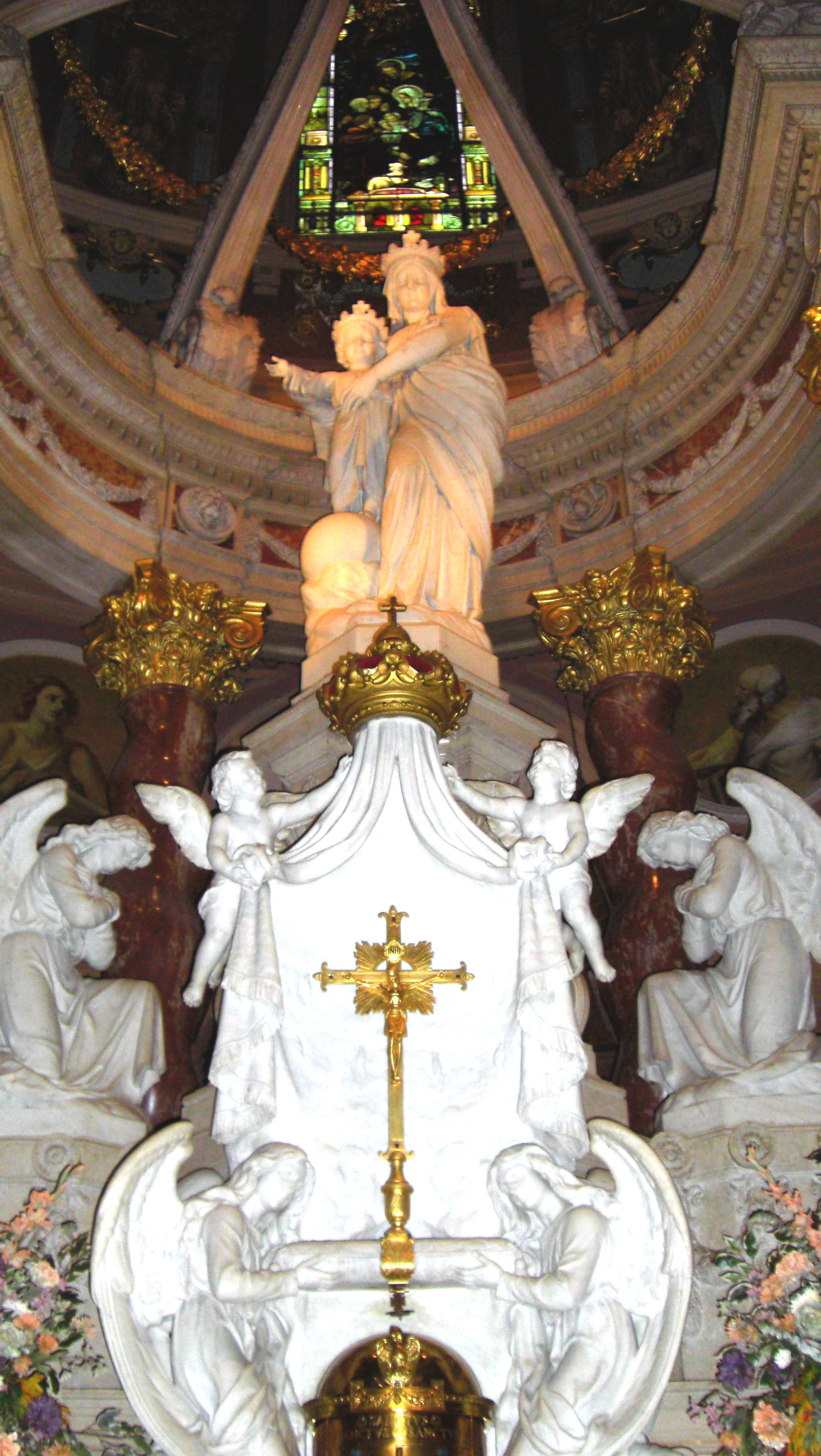
Detail of the statue of Our Lady of Victory on the main altar.

The main altar features a 9 feet (2.7 m) tall, 1,600 pounds (730 kg) statue of Our Lady of Victory. This was blessed by Pope Pius XI after being sculpted in Italy. Baker placed a painting of the pope on the altar in return.

Flanking the altar are four, swirled marble columns of rare red marble, reminiscent of St. Peter's Basilica in Rome. A legend told about the marble says a group of Buffalo-born soldiers stumbled upon the unique red marble while in Spain during World War I. Upon seeing it, the soldiers thought immediately of the basilica being built at home by Father Baker. They went to talk to the Spanish farmer who owned the property. After hearing the story of Father Baker, the farmer agreed to donate the "useless rock" on his property. Arrangements were made and the marble was sent to Lackawanna to complete the work on the basilica's altar.

The main altar stands under a bright blue dome depicting the Holy Spirit in brilliant hues. On the ceiling over the altar, an elongated panel represents "Queen of All Saints". Among the saints are Mary Magdalene, St. Anthony, St. Elizabeth, St. Anne, and St. Theresa.

==== Items of Papal significance ====
Near the altar, at one end of the pews, stands the umbraculum, a symbolic canopy or umbrella which is kept half open until the Pope visits the basilica and completely opens it. The tintinnabulum, a small gold bell mounted on a pole with a golden frame, stands at the other end. It is used to lead the procession when the Pope says Mass within the basilica. These two items, along with the personal coat of arms of a pope, which hangs above the bronze main entrance doors, signify the shrine's Basilica status within the Catholic community.

==== Stations of the Cross ====
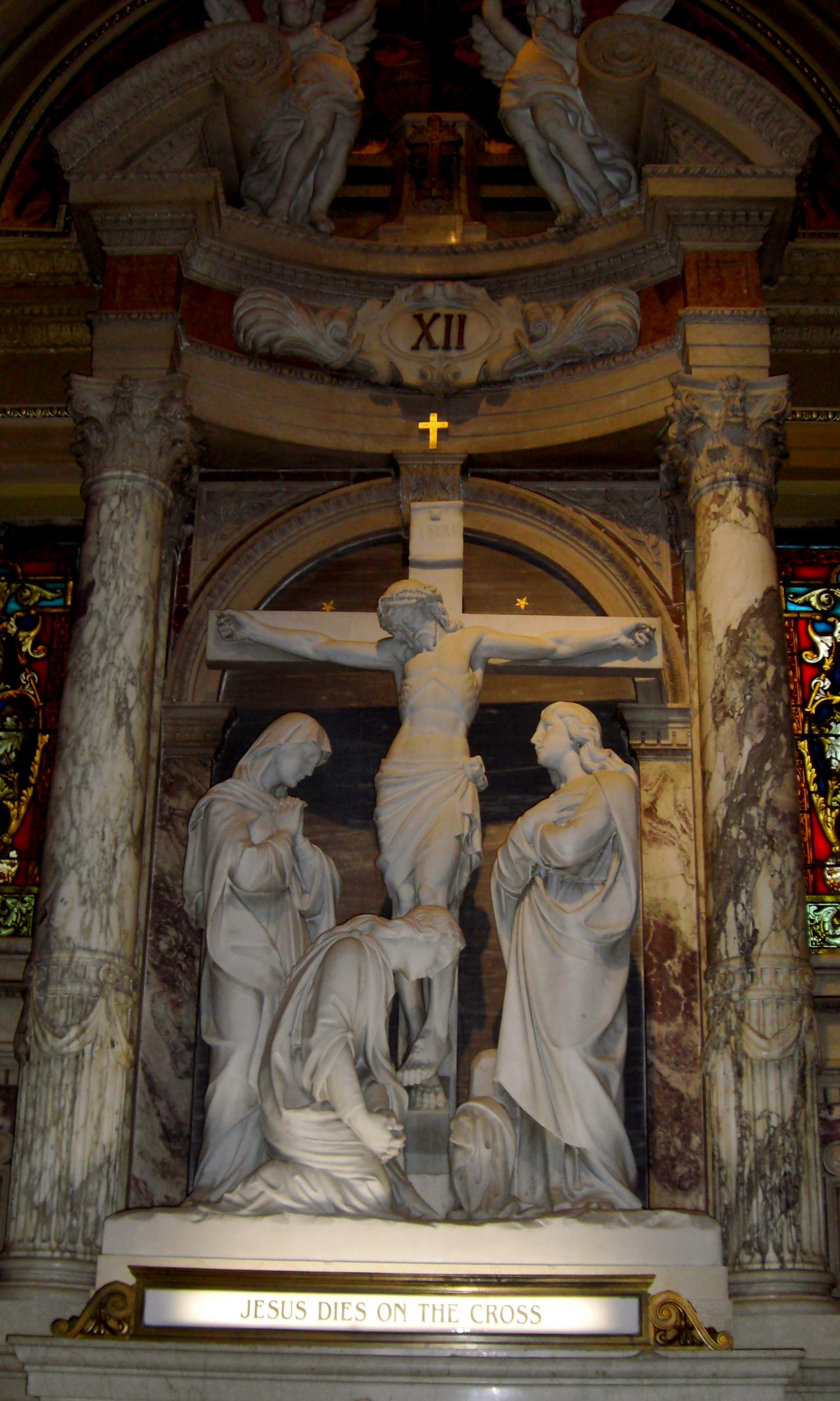
One of the 14 life-size marble Stations of the Cross.

The shrine is flanked by the 14 marble Stations of the Cross, which depict Jesus' final hours before his death. Rather than the elements being carved from separate blocks of marble and assembled for each Station afterwards, each Station was sculpted from single blocks. The figures are depicted at life size. The Italian sculptor Pepini spent 14 years on the design and execution: it is said that each station took a year to complete.

The station entitled "Jesus Meets His Afflicted Mother" was one of Father Baker's favorite places in the basilica. In his 80s by the time the basilica was completed, Baker could be often found leaning on the pillar closest to this Station, meditating and saying prayers.

==== The organ ====
When the original, custom-made Wurlitzer organ installed in the choir loft had deteriorated beyond repair, a specially designed 54-rank pipe organ was installed in its place. Built by the Delaware Pipe Organ Co. and installed in 1981, the organ has three mahogany pipe towers, each in an eight-foot semicircle, representing the Holy Trinity. There are 51 pipes in the three towers, with the balance of pipes located behind the towers. The pipework is of metal and wood, and ranges in length from six inches to 18 feet.

==== The grotto and Father Baker's remains ====
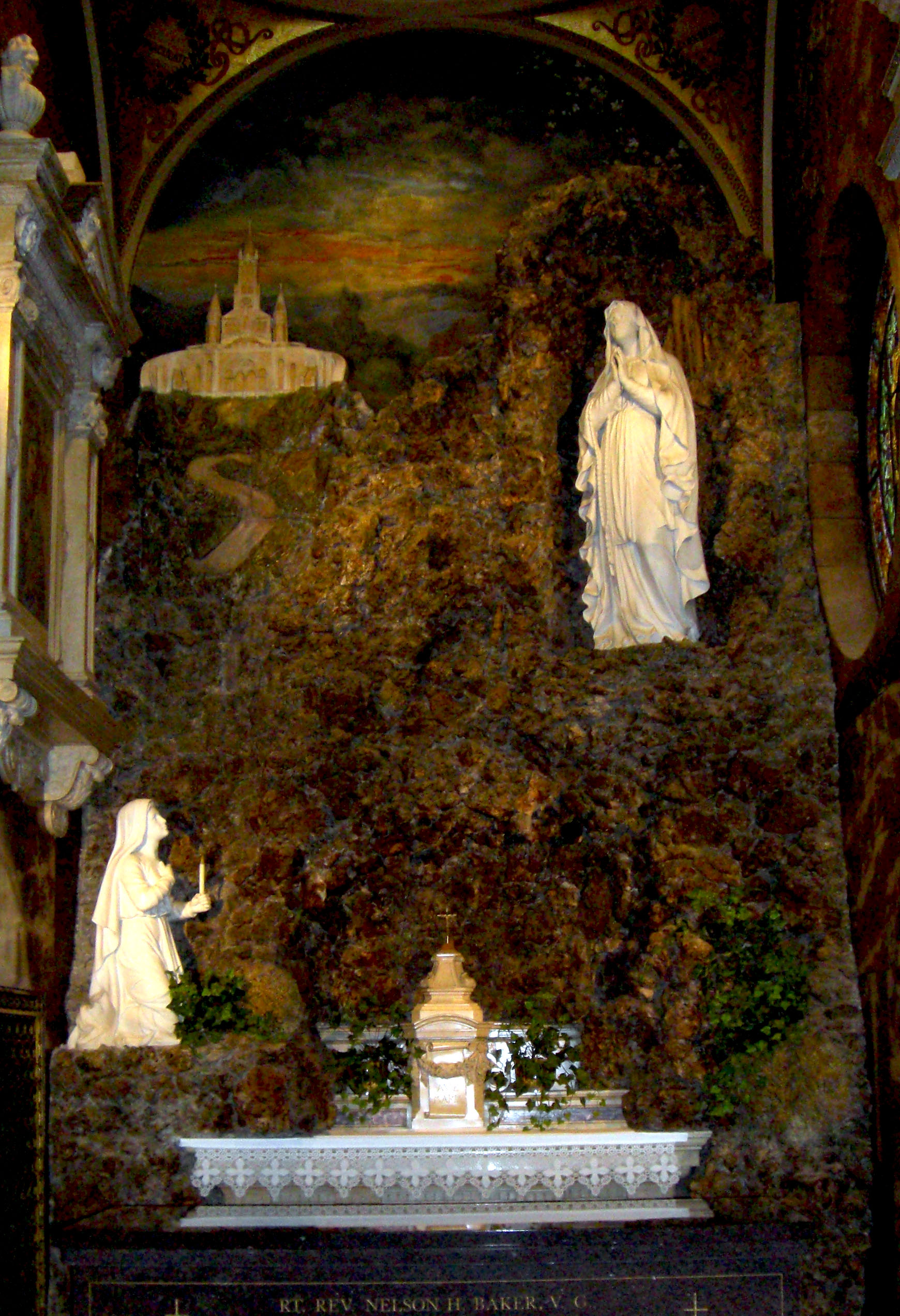
The Grotto Shrine where the remains of Father Nelson Baker were placed in a sarcophagus.

Baker's remains are in a sarcophagus within the Grotto Shrine to Our Lady of Lourdes, found on the southern end of the basilica's transept. The Grotto is hewn out of black lava rock from Mount Vesuvius in Italy. Baker, who had died in 1936, had wanted to find a construction material that was "untouched by humans" to commemorate the vision of the Blessed Mother to St. Bernadette in Lourdes, France.

==== Other places of interest ====
Other sculptures and artwork: The interior is decorated with several religious paintings, sculptures, and mosaics depicting devotion to the Blessed Mother. It is estimated that from 1,500 to 2,500 angels can be found in the basilica in the sculptures and artwork. It was Baker's plan to place an angel in every possible sightline, to remind visitors that although the basilica is dedicated to Our Lady of Victory, its main purpose is meant primarily for God's praise and glory.

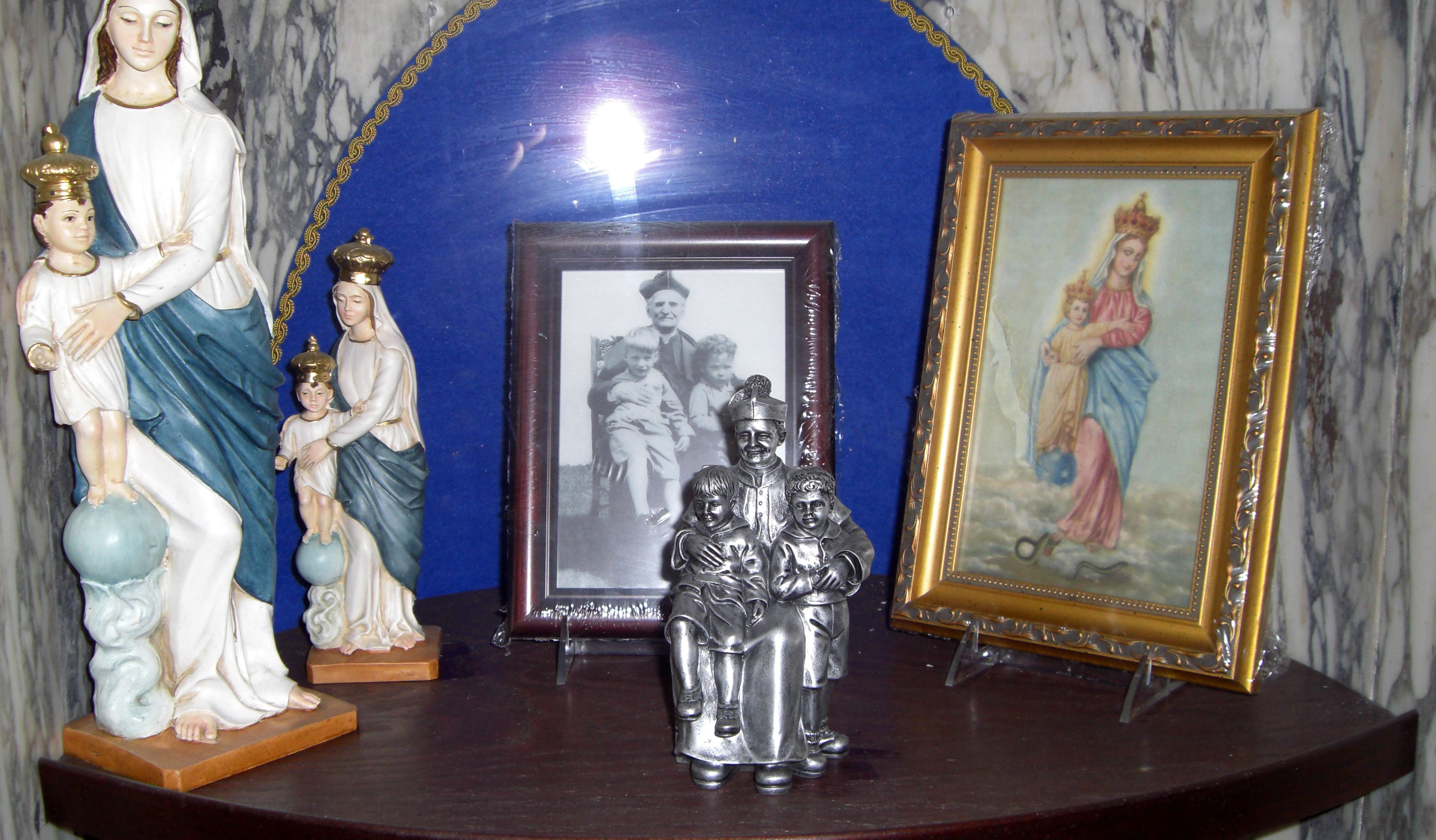
Some of the pictures and memorabilia found in the Father Baker rooms in the basement of the basilica.

Pews and aisle: The basilica's pews are made of rare African mahogany, and provide seating for more than 1,200 individuals. The shrine's floor and aisle are gradually sloped to ensure that all have an unobstructed view of the basilica's main altar.

Altars: In keeping with the style of architecture, five unique altars line the rear wall behind the main altar. These altars are dedicated to: St. Patrick, St. Aloysius Gonzaga, Mary Immaculate, St. Anne, and St. Vincent de Paul whose life work with the poor and needy inspired Father Baker.

Baptistery: Located adjacent to the main altar, the bapistery features a marble baptismal font, as well as dozens of wall and ceiling paintings with religious symbols and peoples.

Father Baker Museum: During late 2009, construction began to create a small museum about Father Baker's life and the history of the Our Lady of Victory Institutions. It is located in the basilica's basement, where the chapel and Father Baker Rooms were formerly located. A number of photos, official documents, vintage newspapers, and Baker's belongings are on display. Items such as Father Baker's desk, books, clothing, and furniture can be found throughout the museum. Also in the museum are cases of photos, information, and memorabilia from the Our Lady of Victory Institutions, such as the Infant Home, Orphanage, Protectory, and the basilica itself. On that floor of the basilica is the remodeled gift shop offering religious items such as rosaries, and related goods.

== Gallery ==
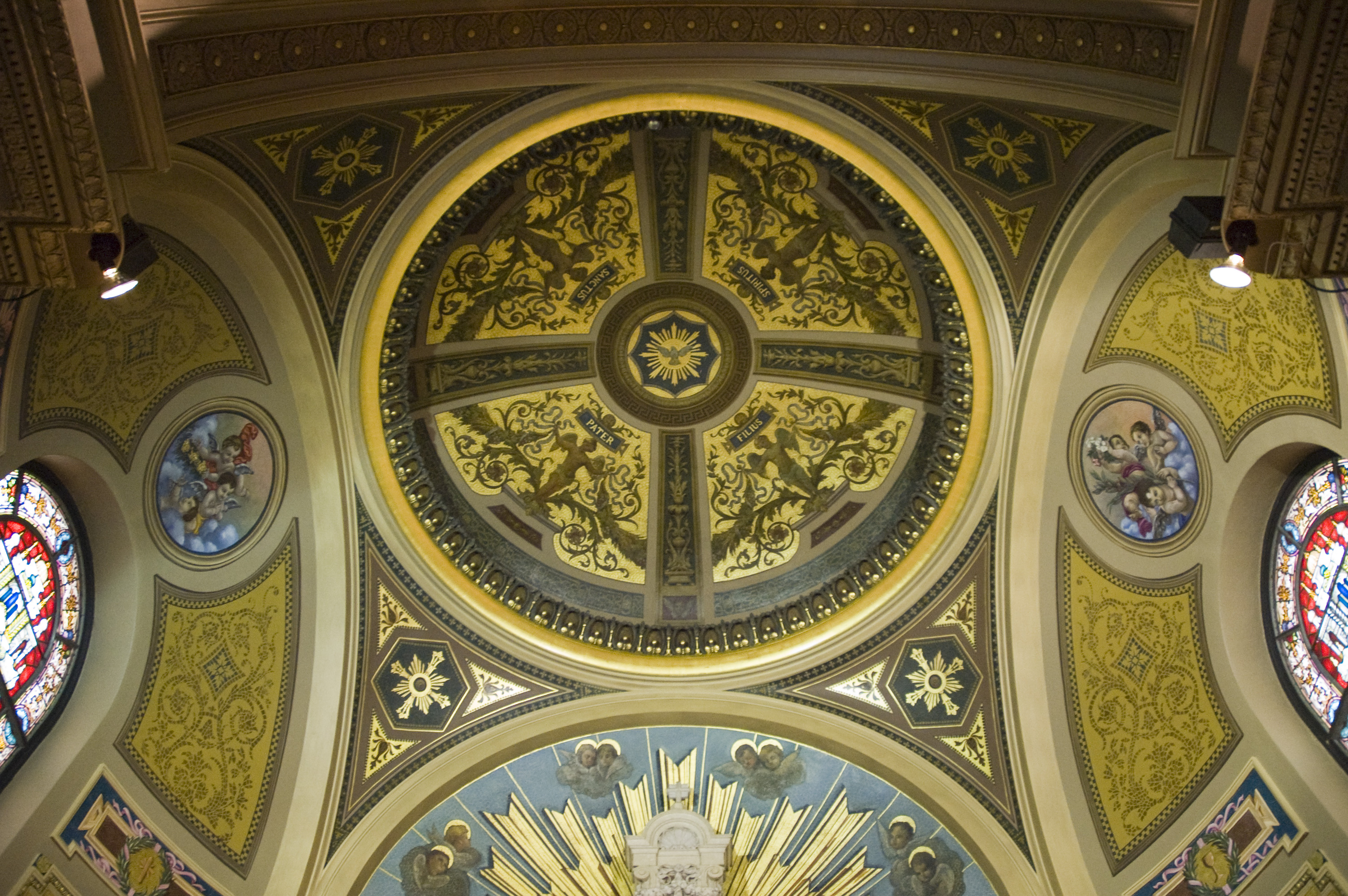
Artwork on the ceiling of the basilica.

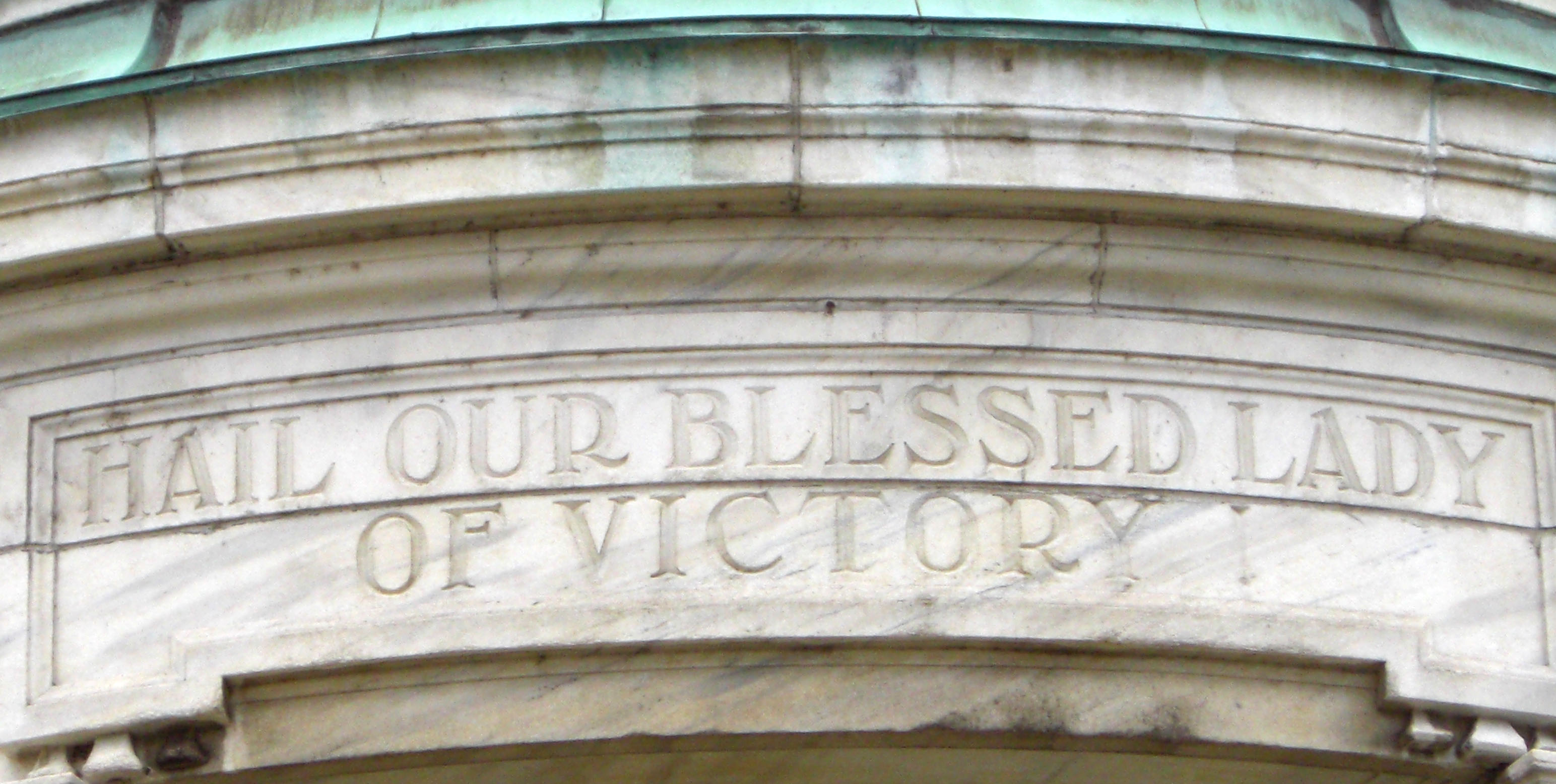
Engraving on top of entrance reading "Our Lady of Victory".

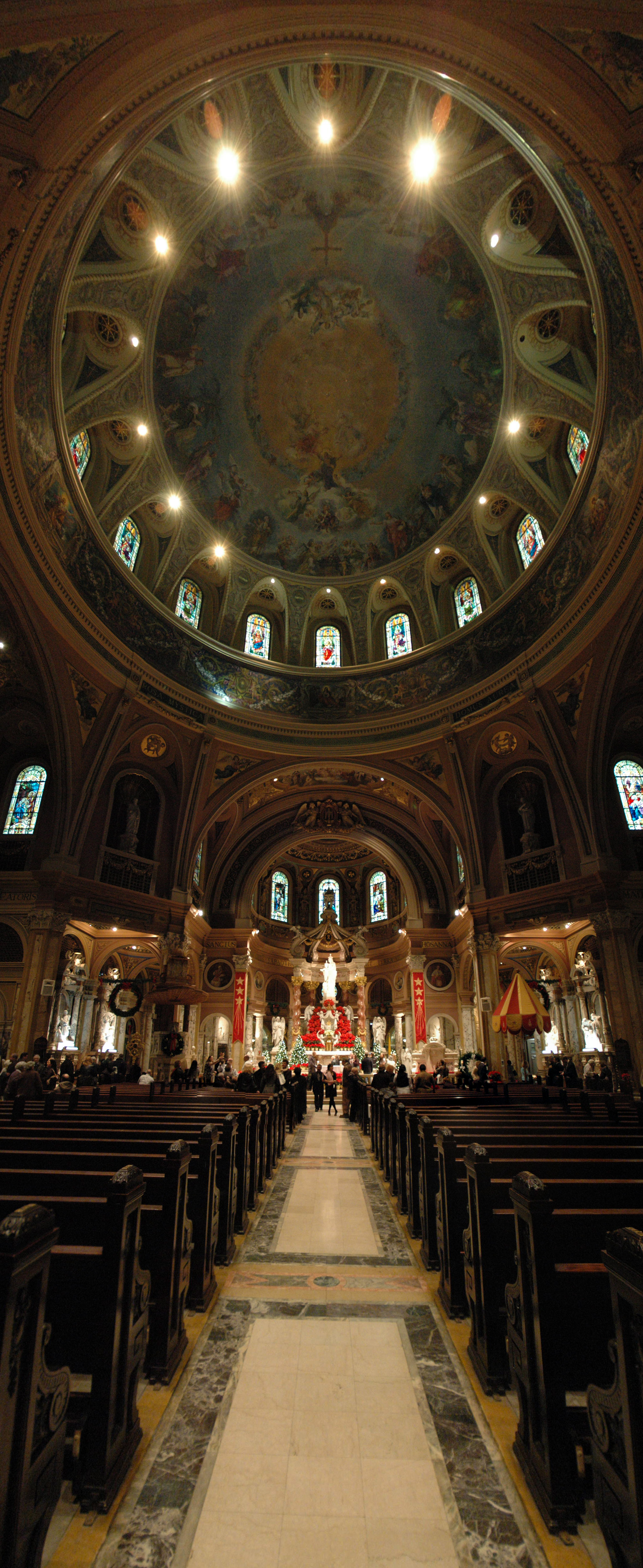
The interior of the basilica.

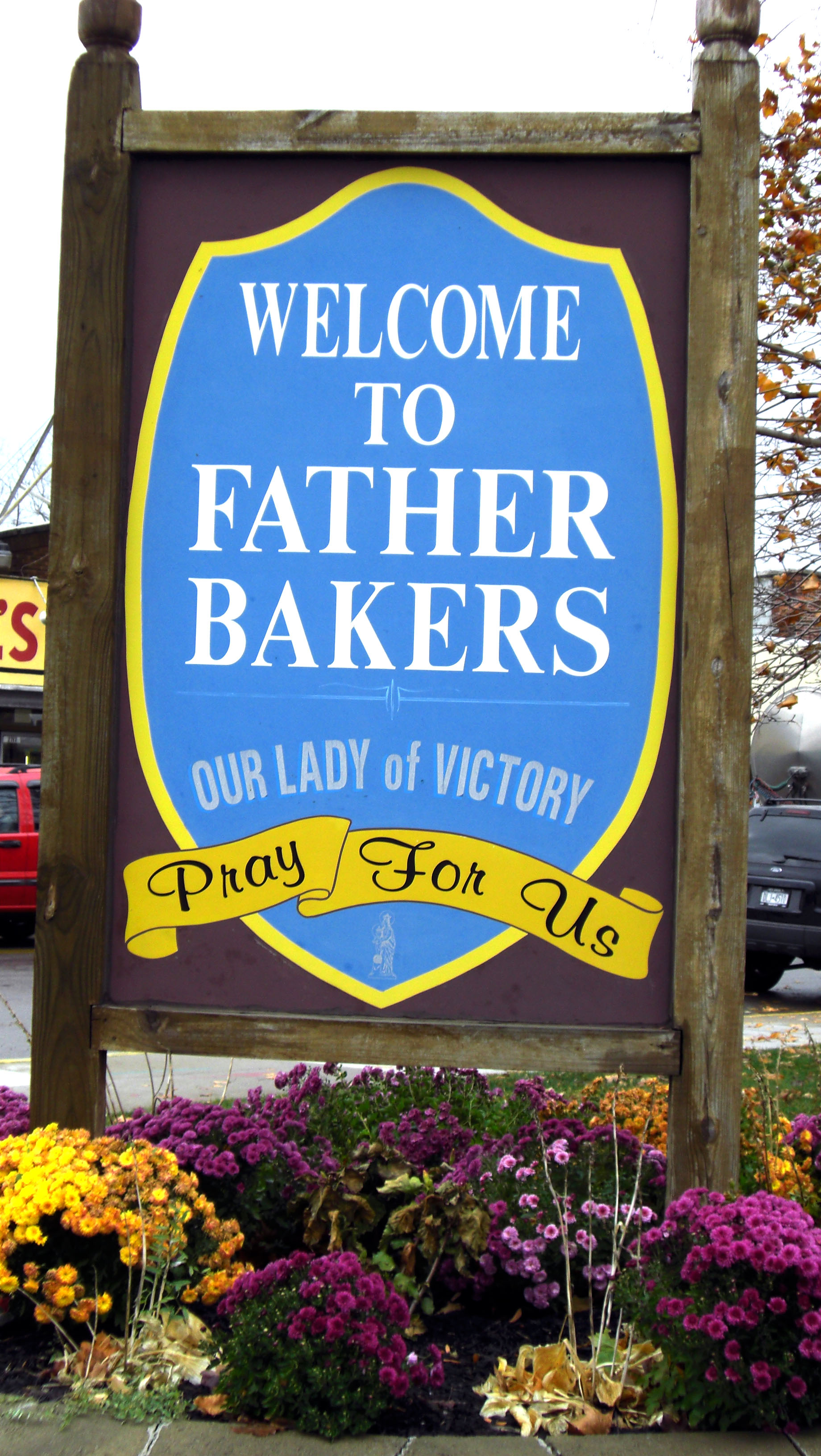
Welcome sign for Fr. Baker's basilica and parish.

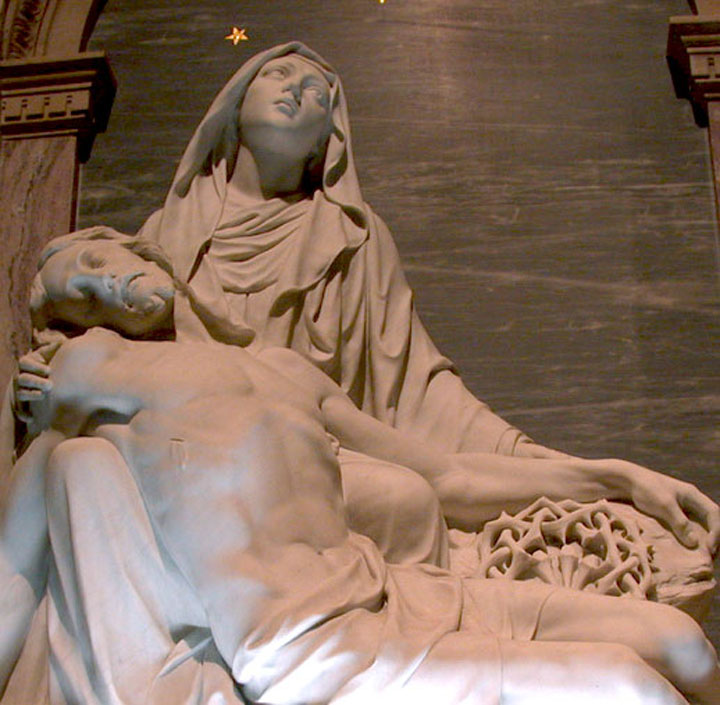
A close up of The Pieta, one of the 14 Stations of the Cross.

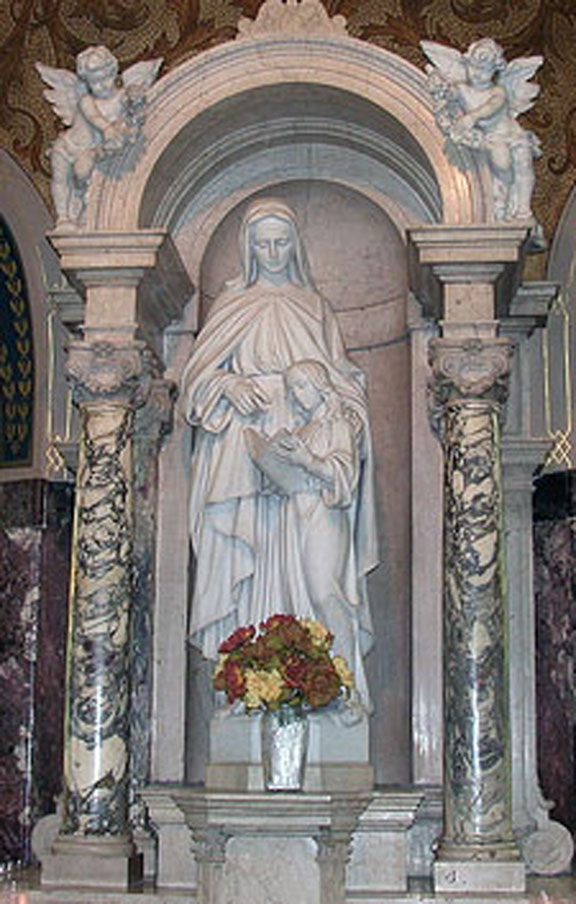
One of five saints altars lining the wall behind the Main Altar.

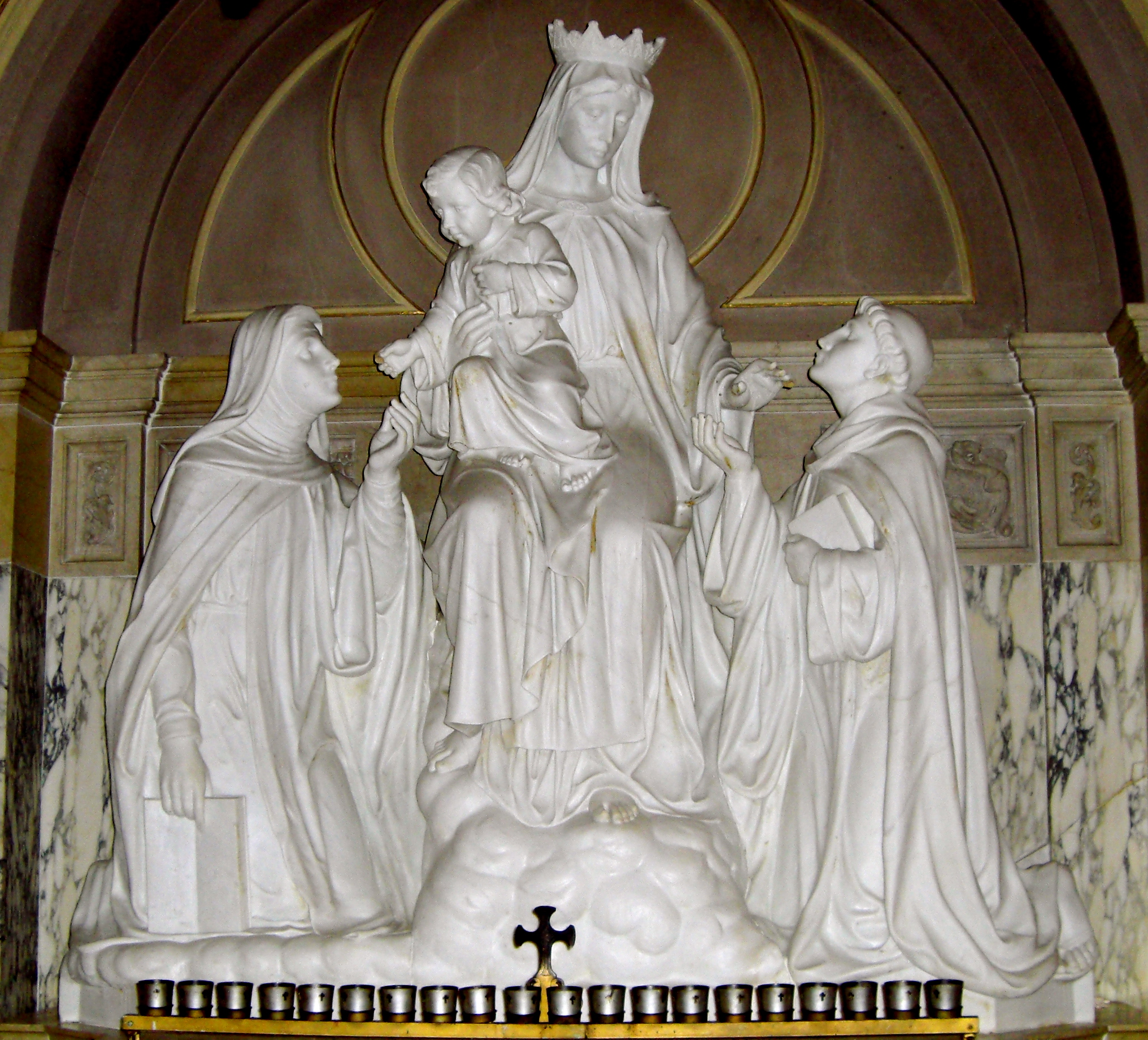
One of several statues of Mary inside the basilica.

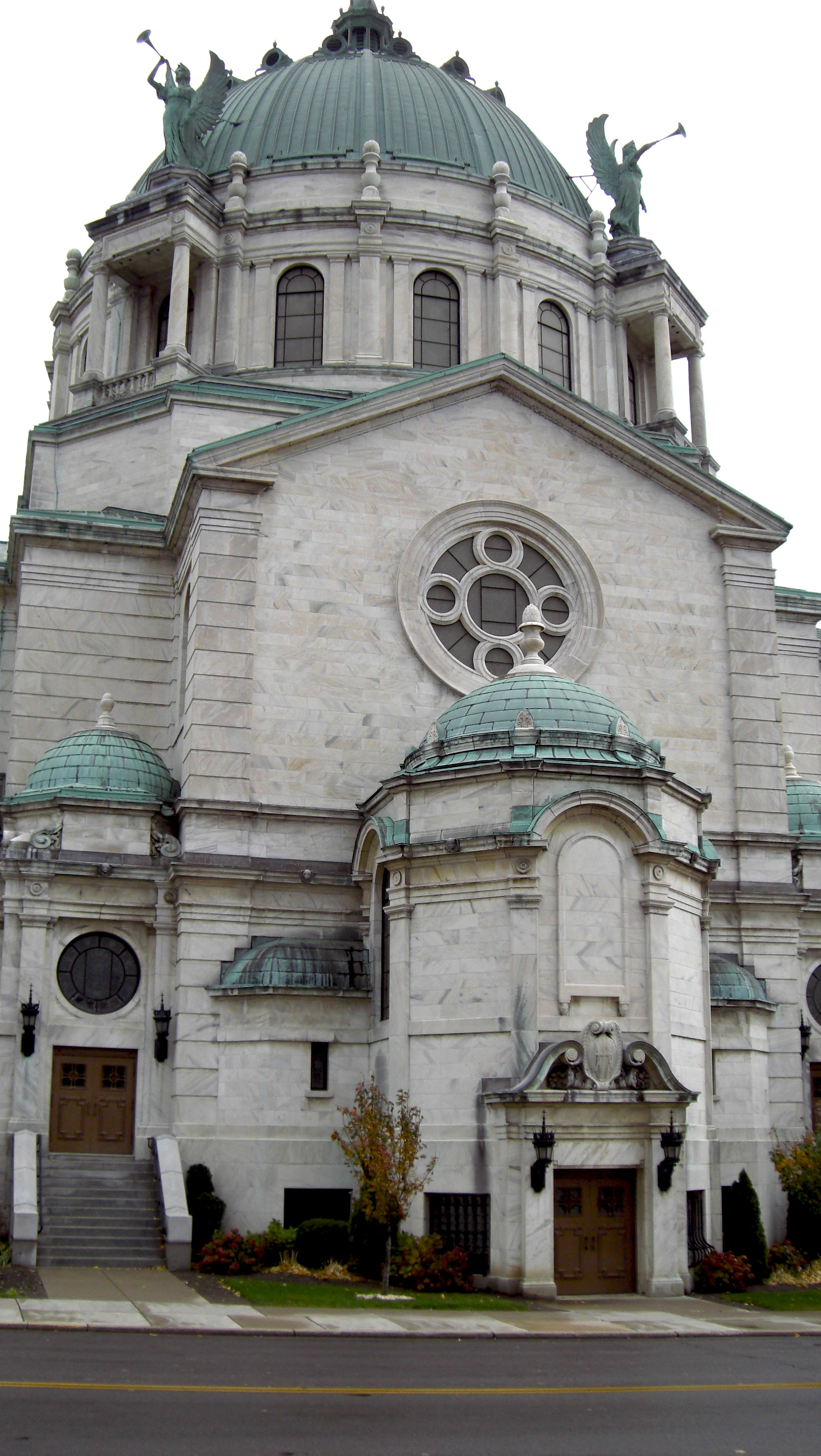
A side view of the Great Dome exterior.

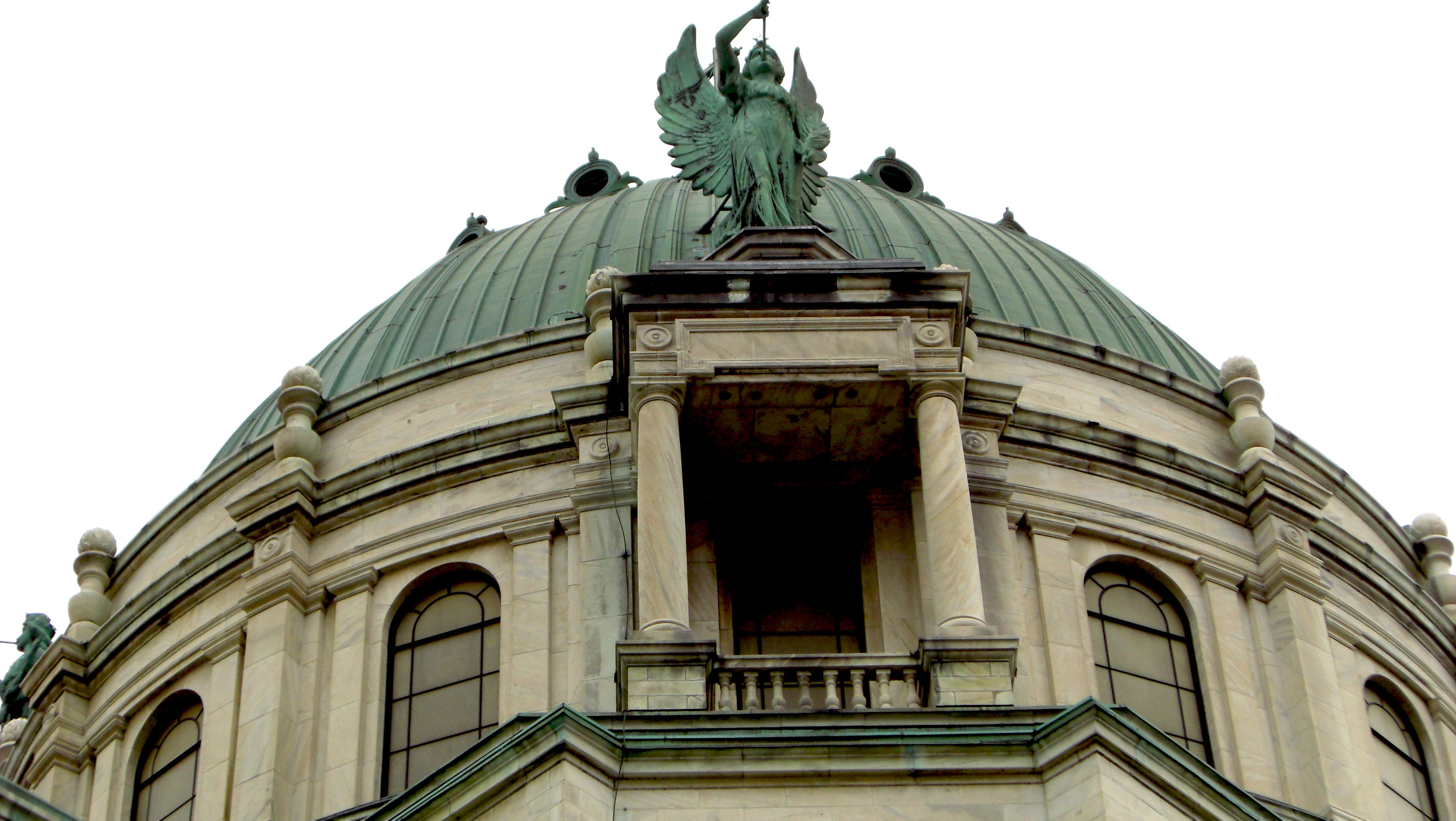
A close-up view of the Great Dome exterior.

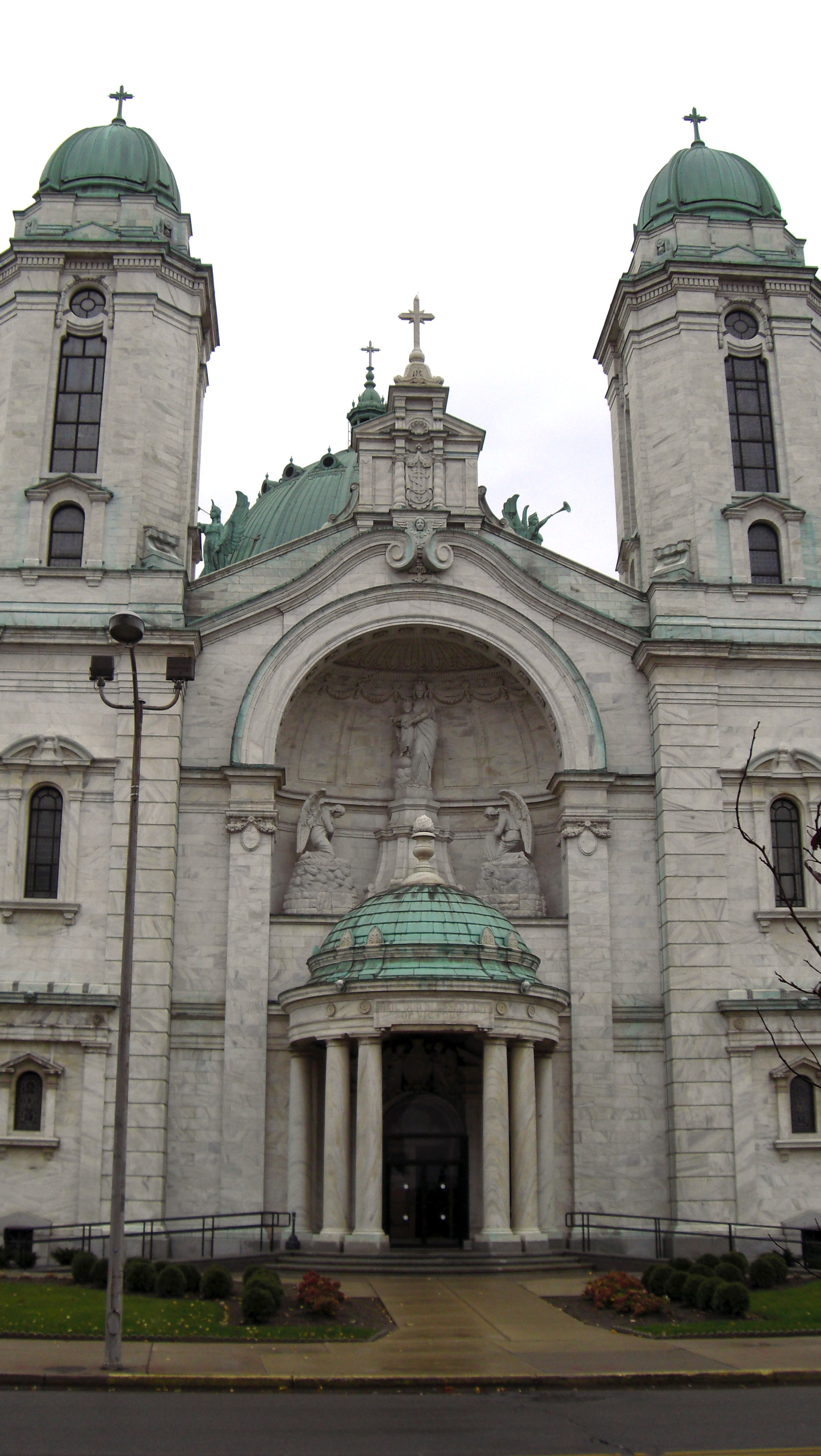
A front view of the basilica's twin towers.

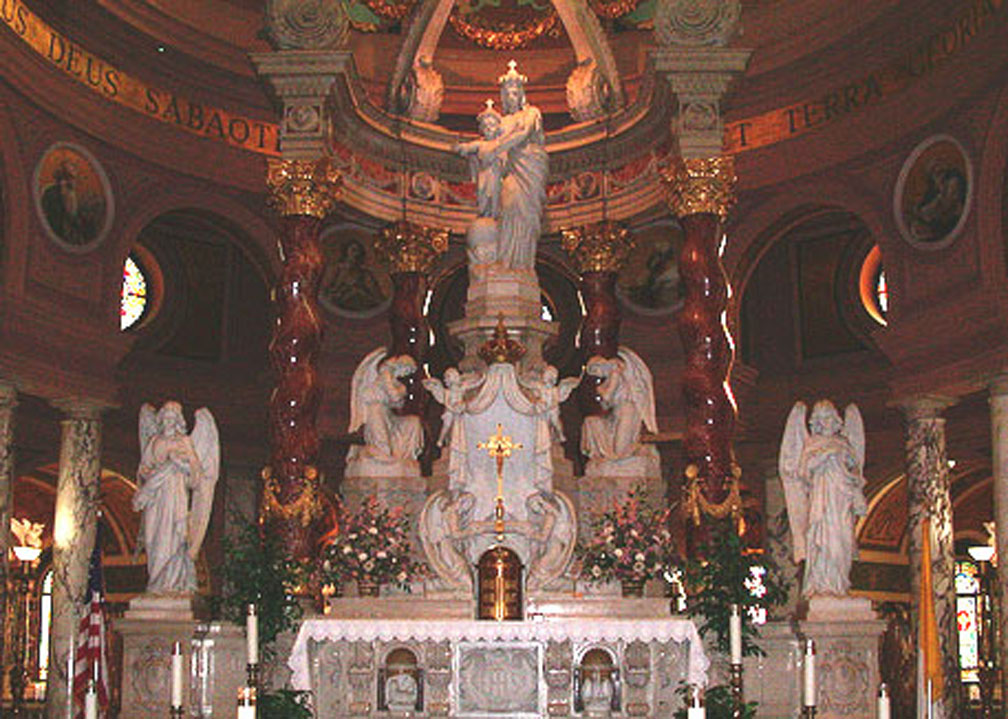
The main altar.

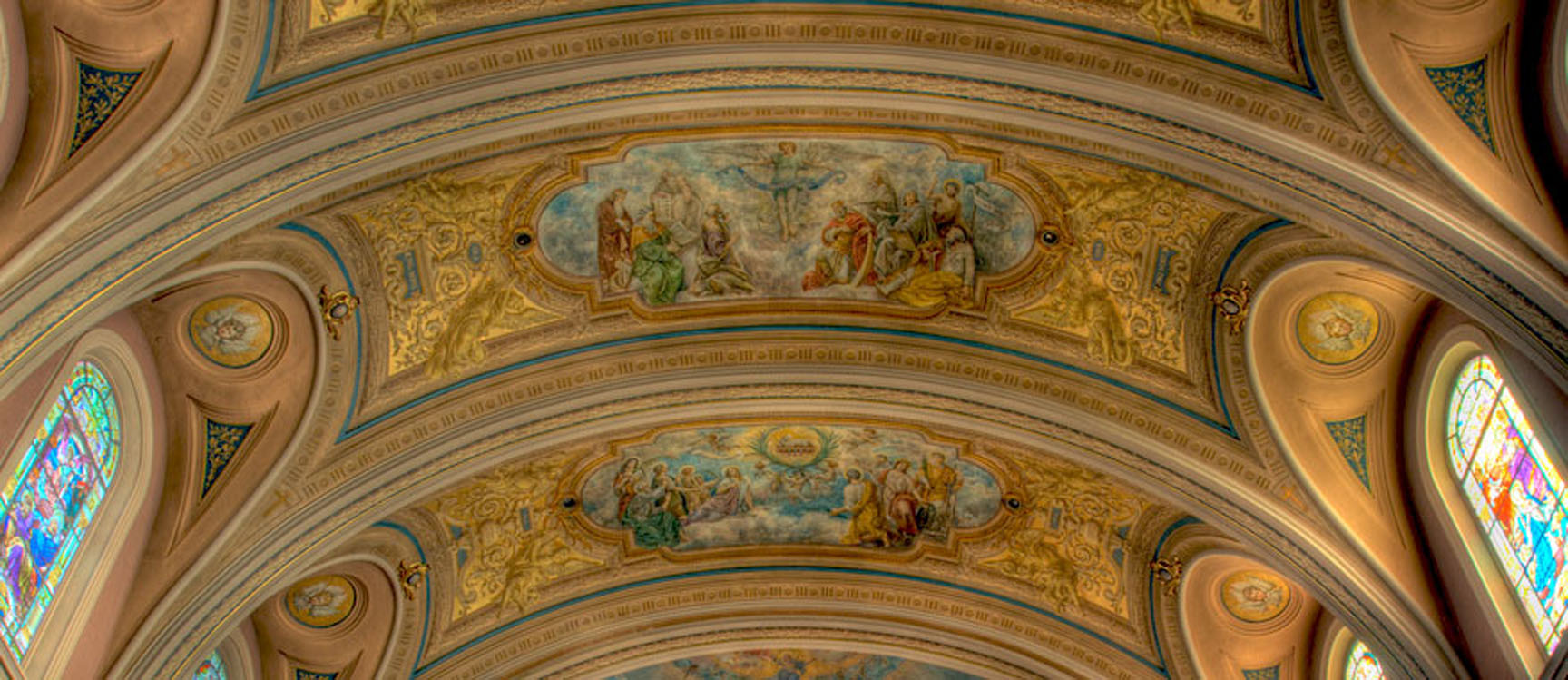
Murals on the interior ceiling.

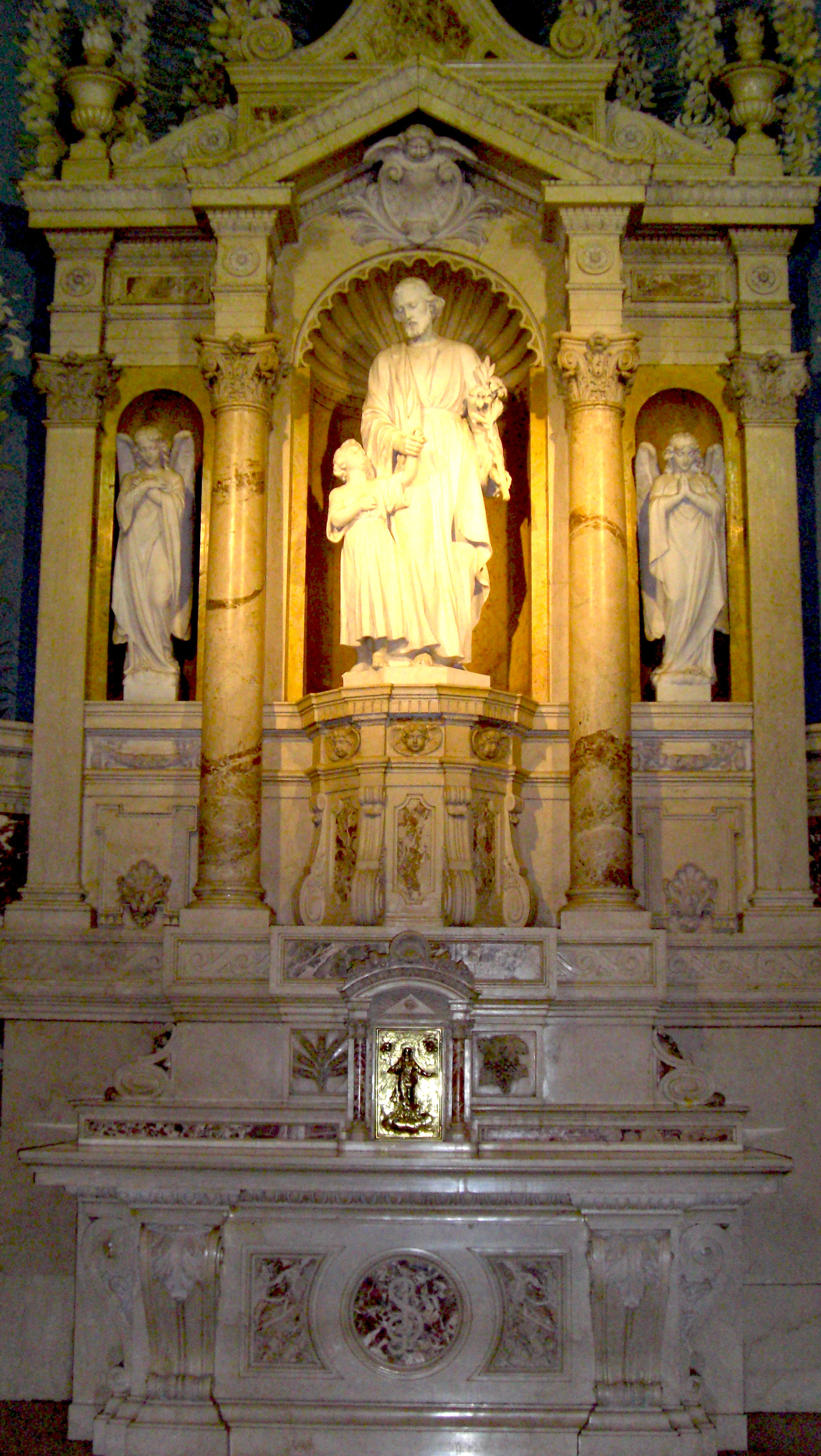
One of the tabernacles.

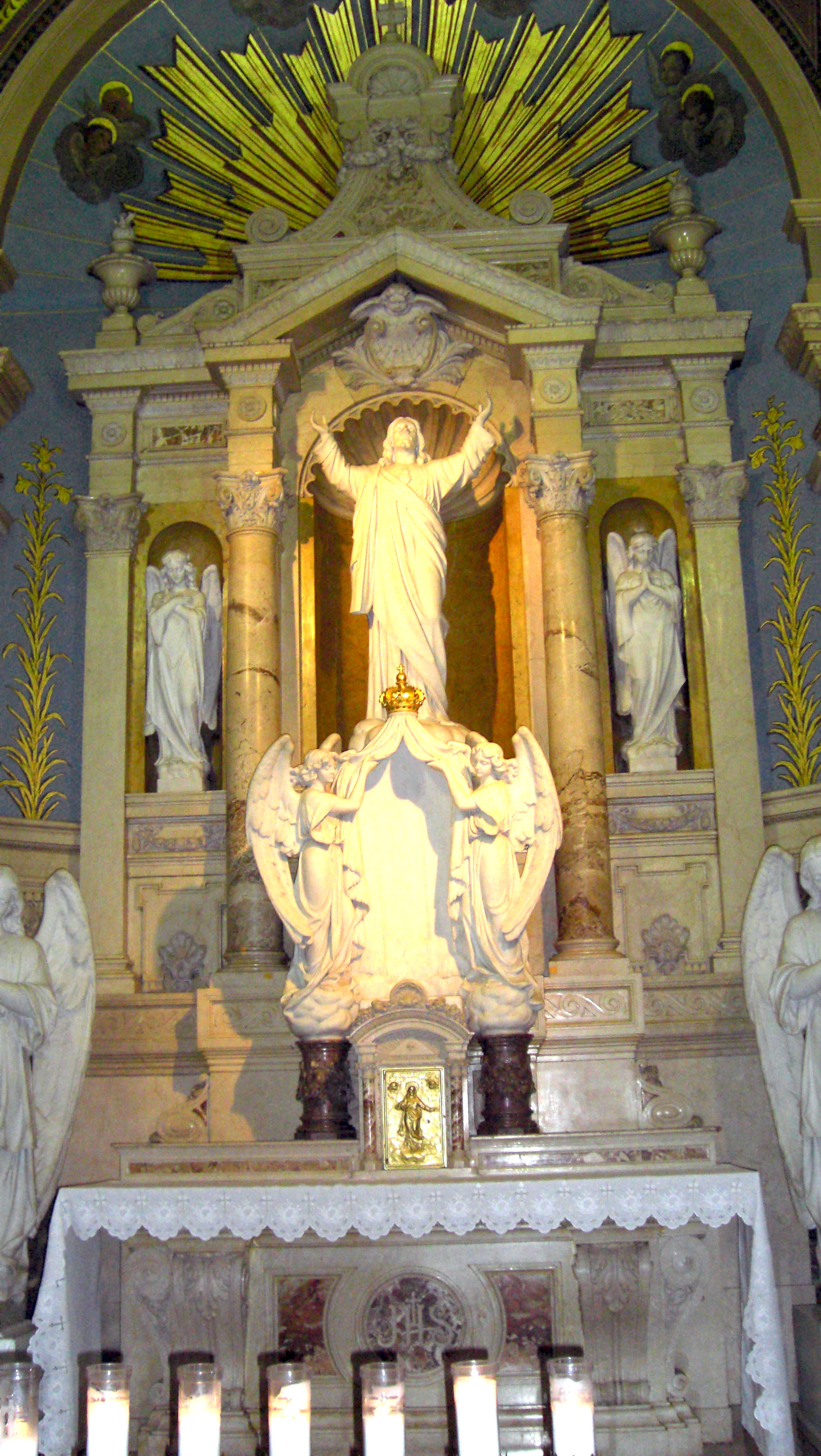
Another of the tabernacles inside the basilica.

The side and front exterior.

Grotto shrine to Lourdes with sarcophagus of Fr. Baker's remains.

A pan down shot from the Great Dome to the main altar.

Detail of the artwork and stained glass windows under Great Dome.

A few of the saint altars that line the wall behind main altar.
